

396001–396100 

|-bgcolor=#E9E9E9
| 396001 ||  || — || May 4, 2005 || Kitt Peak || Spacewatch || — || align=right | 2.4 km || 
|-id=002 bgcolor=#E9E9E9
| 396002 ||  || — || August 24, 2007 || Kitt Peak || Spacewatch || — || align=right data-sort-value="0.90" | 900 m || 
|-id=003 bgcolor=#fefefe
| 396003 ||  || — || July 11, 1997 || Kitt Peak || Spacewatch || — || align=right data-sort-value="0.78" | 780 m || 
|-id=004 bgcolor=#d6d6d6
| 396004 ||  || — || April 13, 2010 || WISE || WISE || — || align=right | 4.0 km || 
|-id=005 bgcolor=#d6d6d6
| 396005 ||  || — || November 24, 2006 || Kitt Peak || Spacewatch || — || align=right | 3.0 km || 
|-id=006 bgcolor=#d6d6d6
| 396006 ||  || — || February 9, 2008 || Kitt Peak || Spacewatch || EMA || align=right | 3.1 km || 
|-id=007 bgcolor=#d6d6d6
| 396007 ||  || — || October 23, 2006 || Kitt Peak || Spacewatch || — || align=right | 2.1 km || 
|-id=008 bgcolor=#d6d6d6
| 396008 ||  || — || January 9, 2013 || Kitt Peak || Spacewatch || EOS || align=right | 2.3 km || 
|-id=009 bgcolor=#d6d6d6
| 396009 ||  || — || January 11, 2008 || Kitt Peak || Spacewatch || KOR || align=right | 1.3 km || 
|-id=010 bgcolor=#E9E9E9
| 396010 ||  || — || September 7, 2011 || Kitt Peak || Spacewatch || — || align=right | 1.5 km || 
|-id=011 bgcolor=#E9E9E9
| 396011 ||  || — || March 18, 2001 || Kitt Peak || Spacewatch || — || align=right | 1.5 km || 
|-id=012 bgcolor=#E9E9E9
| 396012 ||  || — || March 19, 2009 || Kitt Peak || Spacewatch || — || align=right | 1.8 km || 
|-id=013 bgcolor=#E9E9E9
| 396013 ||  || — || October 14, 1999 || Kitt Peak || Spacewatch || — || align=right data-sort-value="0.86" | 860 m || 
|-id=014 bgcolor=#E9E9E9
| 396014 ||  || — || January 15, 1999 || Kitt Peak || Spacewatch || AST || align=right | 1.8 km || 
|-id=015 bgcolor=#fefefe
| 396015 ||  || — || December 22, 2008 || Kitt Peak || Spacewatch || — || align=right data-sort-value="0.98" | 980 m || 
|-id=016 bgcolor=#d6d6d6
| 396016 ||  || — || October 25, 2005 || Kitt Peak || Spacewatch || — || align=right | 2.9 km || 
|-id=017 bgcolor=#d6d6d6
| 396017 ||  || — || November 10, 2006 || Kitt Peak || Spacewatch || LIX || align=right | 3.7 km || 
|-id=018 bgcolor=#d6d6d6
| 396018 ||  || — || June 12, 2010 || WISE || WISE || URS || align=right | 3.7 km || 
|-id=019 bgcolor=#d6d6d6
| 396019 ||  || — || May 22, 1998 || Kitt Peak || Spacewatch || — || align=right | 3.9 km || 
|-id=020 bgcolor=#E9E9E9
| 396020 ||  || — || October 19, 2007 || Catalina || CSS || — || align=right | 2.1 km || 
|-id=021 bgcolor=#d6d6d6
| 396021 ||  || — || November 16, 2006 || Mount Lemmon || Mount Lemmon Survey || — || align=right | 3.4 km || 
|-id=022 bgcolor=#fefefe
| 396022 ||  || — || January 26, 2006 || Mount Lemmon || Mount Lemmon Survey || — || align=right data-sort-value="0.97" | 970 m || 
|-id=023 bgcolor=#E9E9E9
| 396023 ||  || — || April 7, 2005 || Mount Lemmon || Mount Lemmon Survey || — || align=right | 2.4 km || 
|-id=024 bgcolor=#E9E9E9
| 396024 ||  || — || August 27, 2006 || Kitt Peak || Spacewatch || — || align=right | 2.5 km || 
|-id=025 bgcolor=#E9E9E9
| 396025 ||  || — || September 15, 2006 || Kitt Peak || Spacewatch || — || align=right | 1.4 km || 
|-id=026 bgcolor=#E9E9E9
| 396026 ||  || — || March 31, 2009 || Mount Lemmon || Mount Lemmon Survey || AGNfast? || align=right | 1.6 km || 
|-id=027 bgcolor=#E9E9E9
| 396027 ||  || — || June 10, 2010 || Mount Lemmon || Mount Lemmon Survey || — || align=right | 3.3 km || 
|-id=028 bgcolor=#d6d6d6
| 396028 ||  || — || February 7, 2008 || Kitt Peak || Spacewatch || — || align=right | 2.9 km || 
|-id=029 bgcolor=#E9E9E9
| 396029 ||  || — || May 8, 2005 || Kitt Peak || Spacewatch || — || align=right | 2.0 km || 
|-id=030 bgcolor=#E9E9E9
| 396030 ||  || — || December 25, 1998 || Kitt Peak || Spacewatch || AGN || align=right | 1.3 km || 
|-id=031 bgcolor=#d6d6d6
| 396031 ||  || — || January 20, 2002 || Kitt Peak || Spacewatch || — || align=right | 2.8 km || 
|-id=032 bgcolor=#d6d6d6
| 396032 ||  || — || February 28, 2008 || Kitt Peak || Spacewatch || — || align=right | 2.6 km || 
|-id=033 bgcolor=#d6d6d6
| 396033 ||  || — || October 16, 2006 || Kitt Peak || Spacewatch || — || align=right | 2.1 km || 
|-id=034 bgcolor=#E9E9E9
| 396034 ||  || — || September 15, 2006 || Kitt Peak || Spacewatch || — || align=right | 2.3 km || 
|-id=035 bgcolor=#E9E9E9
| 396035 ||  || — || October 16, 2006 || Mount Lemmon || Mount Lemmon Survey || AGN || align=right | 1.4 km || 
|-id=036 bgcolor=#d6d6d6
| 396036 ||  || — || March 12, 2008 || Kitt Peak || Spacewatch || — || align=right | 3.3 km || 
|-id=037 bgcolor=#d6d6d6
| 396037 ||  || — || November 16, 2006 || Mount Lemmon || Mount Lemmon Survey || HYG || align=right | 2.5 km || 
|-id=038 bgcolor=#E9E9E9
| 396038 ||  || — || April 21, 2010 || WISE || WISE || GEF || align=right | 2.1 km || 
|-id=039 bgcolor=#d6d6d6
| 396039 ||  || — || September 12, 2005 || Kitt Peak || Spacewatch || — || align=right | 3.2 km || 
|-id=040 bgcolor=#d6d6d6
| 396040 ||  || — || September 17, 2009 || Kitt Peak || Spacewatch || SHU3:2 || align=right | 7.1 km || 
|-id=041 bgcolor=#d6d6d6
| 396041 ||  || — || November 5, 1994 || Kitt Peak || Spacewatch || EOS || align=right | 2.3 km || 
|-id=042 bgcolor=#d6d6d6
| 396042 ||  || — || December 17, 2001 || Socorro || LINEAR || — || align=right | 2.5 km || 
|-id=043 bgcolor=#d6d6d6
| 396043 ||  || — || September 1, 2011 || Siding Spring || SSS || EUP || align=right | 4.3 km || 
|-id=044 bgcolor=#E9E9E9
| 396044 ||  || — || February 22, 2004 || Kitt Peak || Spacewatch || — || align=right | 2.4 km || 
|-id=045 bgcolor=#d6d6d6
| 396045 ||  || — || October 21, 2006 || Mount Lemmon || Mount Lemmon Survey || — || align=right | 3.6 km || 
|-id=046 bgcolor=#d6d6d6
| 396046 ||  || — || November 7, 2007 || Mount Lemmon || Mount Lemmon Survey || — || align=right | 4.6 km || 
|-id=047 bgcolor=#d6d6d6
| 396047 ||  || — || December 10, 2006 || Kitt Peak || Spacewatch || — || align=right | 3.4 km || 
|-id=048 bgcolor=#d6d6d6
| 396048 ||  || — || March 23, 2003 || Kitt Peak || Spacewatch || — || align=right | 1.9 km || 
|-id=049 bgcolor=#d6d6d6
| 396049 ||  || — || January 5, 2002 || Kitt Peak || Spacewatch || — || align=right | 4.7 km || 
|-id=050 bgcolor=#d6d6d6
| 396050 ||  || — || March 7, 2008 || Kitt Peak || Spacewatch || — || align=right | 2.7 km || 
|-id=051 bgcolor=#E9E9E9
| 396051 ||  || — || July 18, 2006 || Mount Lemmon || Mount Lemmon Survey || — || align=right | 2.3 km || 
|-id=052 bgcolor=#d6d6d6
| 396052 ||  || — || July 20, 2010 || WISE || WISE || — || align=right | 3.1 km || 
|-id=053 bgcolor=#d6d6d6
| 396053 ||  || — || October 2, 2006 || Mount Lemmon || Mount Lemmon Survey || KOR || align=right | 1.3 km || 
|-id=054 bgcolor=#E9E9E9
| 396054 ||  || — || November 11, 2007 || Mount Lemmon || Mount Lemmon Survey || AGN || align=right | 1.3 km || 
|-id=055 bgcolor=#E9E9E9
| 396055 ||  || — || August 29, 2006 || Kitt Peak || Spacewatch || HOF || align=right | 2.7 km || 
|-id=056 bgcolor=#d6d6d6
| 396056 ||  || — || April 29, 2009 || Kitt Peak || Spacewatch || — || align=right | 2.9 km || 
|-id=057 bgcolor=#d6d6d6
| 396057 ||  || — || January 20, 2008 || Mount Lemmon || Mount Lemmon Survey || — || align=right | 3.6 km || 
|-id=058 bgcolor=#d6d6d6
| 396058 ||  || — || February 10, 2008 || Catalina || CSS || — || align=right | 2.2 km || 
|-id=059 bgcolor=#E9E9E9
| 396059 ||  || — || August 27, 2006 || Kitt Peak || Spacewatch || — || align=right | 3.1 km || 
|-id=060 bgcolor=#d6d6d6
| 396060 ||  || — || September 28, 2006 || Kitt Peak || Spacewatch || — || align=right | 2.0 km || 
|-id=061 bgcolor=#d6d6d6
| 396061 ||  || — || April 8, 2008 || Mount Lemmon || Mount Lemmon Survey || — || align=right | 3.0 km || 
|-id=062 bgcolor=#E9E9E9
| 396062 ||  || — || March 1, 2009 || Kitt Peak || Spacewatch || — || align=right | 2.5 km || 
|-id=063 bgcolor=#d6d6d6
| 396063 ||  || — || January 12, 2002 || Kitt Peak || Spacewatch || — || align=right | 2.8 km || 
|-id=064 bgcolor=#E9E9E9
| 396064 ||  || — || September 15, 2006 || Kitt Peak || Spacewatch || — || align=right | 2.3 km || 
|-id=065 bgcolor=#d6d6d6
| 396065 ||  || — || February 10, 2002 || Socorro || LINEAR || EOS || align=right | 4.2 km || 
|-id=066 bgcolor=#d6d6d6
| 396066 ||  || — || June 15, 2010 || WISE || WISE || — || align=right | 4.7 km || 
|-id=067 bgcolor=#d6d6d6
| 396067 ||  || — || September 17, 2006 || Kitt Peak || Spacewatch || — || align=right | 2.1 km || 
|-id=068 bgcolor=#d6d6d6
| 396068 ||  || — || February 11, 2008 || Mount Lemmon || Mount Lemmon Survey || — || align=right | 3.4 km || 
|-id=069 bgcolor=#fefefe
| 396069 ||  || — || May 26, 2003 || Kitt Peak || Spacewatch || V || align=right data-sort-value="0.65" | 650 m || 
|-id=070 bgcolor=#d6d6d6
| 396070 ||  || — || January 15, 2008 || Mount Lemmon || Mount Lemmon Survey || — || align=right | 2.7 km || 
|-id=071 bgcolor=#E9E9E9
| 396071 ||  || — || February 14, 2004 || Kitt Peak || Spacewatch || — || align=right | 2.2 km || 
|-id=072 bgcolor=#d6d6d6
| 396072 ||  || — || March 6, 2008 || Mount Lemmon || Mount Lemmon Survey || — || align=right | 3.1 km || 
|-id=073 bgcolor=#fefefe
| 396073 ||  || — || December 23, 1998 || Kitt Peak || Spacewatch || — || align=right data-sort-value="0.80" | 800 m || 
|-id=074 bgcolor=#d6d6d6
| 396074 ||  || — || December 20, 2007 || Mount Lemmon || Mount Lemmon Survey || — || align=right | 2.5 km || 
|-id=075 bgcolor=#d6d6d6
| 396075 ||  || — || September 12, 1994 || Kitt Peak || Spacewatch || — || align=right | 2.9 km || 
|-id=076 bgcolor=#E9E9E9
| 396076 ||  || — || March 15, 2004 || Kitt Peak || Spacewatch || — || align=right | 2.4 km || 
|-id=077 bgcolor=#E9E9E9
| 396077 ||  || — || April 16, 2005 || Catalina || CSS || MAR || align=right | 1.3 km || 
|-id=078 bgcolor=#d6d6d6
| 396078 ||  || — || October 21, 2006 || Mount Lemmon || Mount Lemmon Survey || KOR || align=right | 1.3 km || 
|-id=079 bgcolor=#E9E9E9
| 396079 ||  || — || March 3, 2009 || Kitt Peak || Spacewatch || — || align=right | 2.0 km || 
|-id=080 bgcolor=#E9E9E9
| 396080 ||  || — || January 15, 2005 || Kitt Peak || Spacewatch || — || align=right | 1.1 km || 
|-id=081 bgcolor=#E9E9E9
| 396081 ||  || — || February 2, 2009 || Kitt Peak || Spacewatch || — || align=right | 1.8 km || 
|-id=082 bgcolor=#d6d6d6
| 396082 ||  || — || November 23, 2006 || Mount Lemmon || Mount Lemmon Survey || — || align=right | 3.6 km || 
|-id=083 bgcolor=#d6d6d6
| 396083 ||  || — || March 30, 2008 || Catalina || CSS || — || align=right | 3.3 km || 
|-id=084 bgcolor=#d6d6d6
| 396084 ||  || — || February 4, 2005 || Mount Lemmon || Mount Lemmon Survey || 3:2 || align=right | 4.7 km || 
|-id=085 bgcolor=#E9E9E9
| 396085 ||  || — || October 12, 2007 || Mount Lemmon || Mount Lemmon Survey || — || align=right | 1.2 km || 
|-id=086 bgcolor=#d6d6d6
| 396086 ||  || — || April 5, 2003 || Kitt Peak || Spacewatch || — || align=right | 2.7 km || 
|-id=087 bgcolor=#d6d6d6
| 396087 ||  || — || February 7, 2002 || Socorro || LINEAR || — || align=right | 4.3 km || 
|-id=088 bgcolor=#E9E9E9
| 396088 ||  || — || December 17, 2007 || Kitt Peak || Spacewatch || — || align=right | 2.3 km || 
|-id=089 bgcolor=#d6d6d6
| 396089 ||  || — || January 14, 2002 || Socorro || LINEAR || — || align=right | 3.8 km || 
|-id=090 bgcolor=#E9E9E9
| 396090 ||  || — || September 15, 2007 || Siding Spring || SSS || BAR || align=right | 1.2 km || 
|-id=091 bgcolor=#d6d6d6
| 396091 ||  || — || June 3, 2009 || Mount Lemmon || Mount Lemmon Survey || — || align=right | 3.0 km || 
|-id=092 bgcolor=#E9E9E9
| 396092 ||  || — || June 8, 2005 || Kitt Peak || Spacewatch || — || align=right | 2.2 km || 
|-id=093 bgcolor=#d6d6d6
| 396093 ||  || — || February 10, 2002 || Socorro || LINEAR || — || align=right | 3.4 km || 
|-id=094 bgcolor=#E9E9E9
| 396094 ||  || — || October 30, 2007 || Kitt Peak || Spacewatch || — || align=right | 2.3 km || 
|-id=095 bgcolor=#d6d6d6
| 396095 ||  || — || December 14, 2006 || Kitt Peak || Spacewatch || — || align=right | 5.2 km || 
|-id=096 bgcolor=#d6d6d6
| 396096 ||  || — || January 30, 2003 || Kitt Peak || Spacewatch || — || align=right | 3.9 km || 
|-id=097 bgcolor=#d6d6d6
| 396097 ||  || — || February 7, 2002 || Socorro || LINEAR || — || align=right | 3.7 km || 
|-id=098 bgcolor=#d6d6d6
| 396098 ||  || — || October 30, 2005 || Kitt Peak || Spacewatch || — || align=right | 3.2 km || 
|-id=099 bgcolor=#d6d6d6
| 396099 ||  || — || February 18, 2008 || Mount Lemmon || Mount Lemmon Survey || — || align=right | 3.6 km || 
|-id=100 bgcolor=#d6d6d6
| 396100 ||  || — || February 26, 2007 || Mount Lemmon || Mount Lemmon Survey || — || align=right | 5.5 km || 
|}

396101–396200 

|-bgcolor=#d6d6d6
| 396101 ||  || — || February 7, 2008 || Mount Lemmon || Mount Lemmon Survey || — || align=right | 2.4 km || 
|-id=102 bgcolor=#E9E9E9
| 396102 ||  || — || December 19, 2003 || Kitt Peak || Spacewatch || — || align=right | 2.7 km || 
|-id=103 bgcolor=#d6d6d6
| 396103 ||  || — || April 2, 2006 || Kitt Peak || Spacewatch || SHU3:2 || align=right | 6.0 km || 
|-id=104 bgcolor=#E9E9E9
| 396104 ||  || — || December 19, 2003 || Kitt Peak || Spacewatch || — || align=right | 2.1 km || 
|-id=105 bgcolor=#d6d6d6
| 396105 ||  || — || February 1, 2008 || Mount Lemmon || Mount Lemmon Survey || — || align=right | 3.0 km || 
|-id=106 bgcolor=#d6d6d6
| 396106 ||  || — || December 1, 2005 || Kitt Peak || Spacewatch || 7:4 || align=right | 3.6 km || 
|-id=107 bgcolor=#d6d6d6
| 396107 ||  || — || August 30, 2005 || Kitt Peak || Spacewatch || — || align=right | 2.8 km || 
|-id=108 bgcolor=#C2FFFF
| 396108 ||  || — || September 13, 2007 || Mount Lemmon || Mount Lemmon Survey || L4 || align=right | 9.1 km || 
|-id=109 bgcolor=#d6d6d6
| 396109 ||  || — || August 26, 1998 || Kitt Peak || Spacewatch || 7:4 || align=right | 3.0 km || 
|-id=110 bgcolor=#d6d6d6
| 396110 ||  || — || March 1, 2008 || Kitt Peak || Spacewatch || — || align=right | 3.2 km || 
|-id=111 bgcolor=#d6d6d6
| 396111 ||  || — || January 24, 2007 || Kitt Peak || Spacewatch || — || align=right | 3.1 km || 
|-id=112 bgcolor=#d6d6d6
| 396112 ||  || — || February 10, 2007 || Mount Lemmon || Mount Lemmon Survey || VER || align=right | 2.5 km || 
|-id=113 bgcolor=#d6d6d6
| 396113 ||  || — || February 8, 2007 || Kitt Peak || Spacewatch || — || align=right | 4.1 km || 
|-id=114 bgcolor=#d6d6d6
| 396114 ||  || — || March 15, 2008 || Kitt Peak || Spacewatch || EOS || align=right | 1.8 km || 
|-id=115 bgcolor=#d6d6d6
| 396115 ||  || — || September 25, 2005 || Catalina || CSS || — || align=right | 3.7 km || 
|-id=116 bgcolor=#d6d6d6
| 396116 ||  || — || April 3, 2008 || Kitt Peak || Spacewatch ||  || align=right | 2.9 km || 
|-id=117 bgcolor=#d6d6d6
| 396117 ||  || — || October 4, 2006 || Mount Lemmon || Mount Lemmon Survey ||  || align=right | 2.3 km || 
|-id=118 bgcolor=#d6d6d6
| 396118 ||  || — || February 12, 2008 || Kitt Peak || Spacewatch || — || align=right | 2.5 km || 
|-id=119 bgcolor=#d6d6d6
| 396119 ||  || — || February 8, 2013 || XuYi || PMO NEO || URS || align=right | 3.3 km || 
|-id=120 bgcolor=#d6d6d6
| 396120 ||  || — || December 13, 2006 || Mount Lemmon || Mount Lemmon Survey || — || align=right | 3.3 km || 
|-id=121 bgcolor=#d6d6d6
| 396121 ||  || — || January 26, 2007 || Kitt Peak || Spacewatch || VER || align=right | 3.5 km || 
|-id=122 bgcolor=#E9E9E9
| 396122 ||  || — || May 8, 2005 || Kitt Peak || Spacewatch || WIT || align=right | 1.1 km || 
|-id=123 bgcolor=#d6d6d6
| 396123 ||  || — || February 7, 2002 || Socorro || LINEAR || — || align=right | 4.4 km || 
|-id=124 bgcolor=#E9E9E9
| 396124 ||  || — || August 19, 2006 || Kitt Peak || Spacewatch || — || align=right | 2.5 km || 
|-id=125 bgcolor=#d6d6d6
| 396125 ||  || — || October 22, 2006 || Mount Lemmon || Mount Lemmon Survey || (1298) || align=right | 2.5 km || 
|-id=126 bgcolor=#E9E9E9
| 396126 ||  || — || March 11, 2005 || Anderson Mesa || LONEOS || — || align=right | 1.8 km || 
|-id=127 bgcolor=#E9E9E9
| 396127 ||  || — || April 7, 2005 || Catalina || CSS || — || align=right | 2.8 km || 
|-id=128 bgcolor=#d6d6d6
| 396128 ||  || — || March 3, 1997 || Kitt Peak || Spacewatch || 3:2 || align=right | 4.7 km || 
|-id=129 bgcolor=#d6d6d6
| 396129 ||  || — || January 17, 2007 || Kitt Peak || Spacewatch || — || align=right | 2.7 km || 
|-id=130 bgcolor=#d6d6d6
| 396130 ||  || — || December 23, 2006 || Mount Lemmon || Mount Lemmon Survey || — || align=right | 3.0 km || 
|-id=131 bgcolor=#E9E9E9
| 396131 ||  || — || February 17, 2004 || Kitt Peak || Spacewatch || NEM || align=right | 2.3 km || 
|-id=132 bgcolor=#E9E9E9
| 396132 ||  || — || September 20, 2011 || Kitt Peak || Spacewatch || — || align=right | 1.9 km || 
|-id=133 bgcolor=#C2FFFF
| 396133 ||  || — || September 15, 2007 || Mount Lemmon || Mount Lemmon Survey || L4 || align=right | 7.8 km || 
|-id=134 bgcolor=#C2FFFF
| 396134 ||  || — || October 9, 2008 || Mount Lemmon || Mount Lemmon Survey || L4 || align=right | 7.2 km || 
|-id=135 bgcolor=#E9E9E9
| 396135 ||  || — || October 2, 2006 || Mount Lemmon || Mount Lemmon Survey || HOF || align=right | 2.2 km || 
|-id=136 bgcolor=#d6d6d6
| 396136 ||  || — || April 25, 2006 || Mount Lemmon || Mount Lemmon Survey || SHU3:2 || align=right | 6.1 km || 
|-id=137 bgcolor=#E9E9E9
| 396137 ||  || — || April 21, 2009 || Mount Lemmon || Mount Lemmon Survey || — || align=right | 3.4 km || 
|-id=138 bgcolor=#d6d6d6
| 396138 ||  || — || November 1, 2006 || Kitt Peak || Spacewatch || — || align=right | 2.1 km || 
|-id=139 bgcolor=#d6d6d6
| 396139 ||  || — || November 20, 2006 || Mount Lemmon || Mount Lemmon Survey || — || align=right | 2.2 km || 
|-id=140 bgcolor=#C2FFFF
| 396140 ||  || — || January 20, 2012 || Mount Lemmon || Mount Lemmon Survey || L4 || align=right | 7.1 km || 
|-id=141 bgcolor=#d6d6d6
| 396141 ||  || — || November 25, 2006 || Mount Lemmon || Mount Lemmon Survey || — || align=right | 4.8 km || 
|-id=142 bgcolor=#d6d6d6
| 396142 ||  || — || March 11, 2008 || Mount Lemmon || Mount Lemmon Survey || — || align=right | 3.6 km || 
|-id=143 bgcolor=#d6d6d6
| 396143 ||  || — || April 15, 2008 || Mount Lemmon || Mount Lemmon Survey || 7:4 || align=right | 4.5 km || 
|-id=144 bgcolor=#E9E9E9
| 396144 ||  || — || March 16, 2004 || Campo Imperatore || CINEOS || — || align=right | 2.6 km || 
|-id=145 bgcolor=#d6d6d6
| 396145 ||  || — || April 15, 2008 || Mount Lemmon || Mount Lemmon Survey || — || align=right | 3.0 km || 
|-id=146 bgcolor=#E9E9E9
| 396146 ||  || — || October 19, 1995 || Kitt Peak || Spacewatch || (5) || align=right data-sort-value="0.88" | 880 m || 
|-id=147 bgcolor=#E9E9E9
| 396147 ||  || — || May 16, 2005 || Mount Lemmon || Mount Lemmon Survey || — || align=right | 2.4 km || 
|-id=148 bgcolor=#d6d6d6
| 396148 ||  || — || October 26, 2005 || Kitt Peak || Spacewatch || — || align=right | 2.8 km || 
|-id=149 bgcolor=#E9E9E9
| 396149 ||  || — || February 18, 2004 || Kitt Peak || Spacewatch || — || align=right | 2.5 km || 
|-id=150 bgcolor=#E9E9E9
| 396150 ||  || — || December 6, 2007 || Kitt Peak || Spacewatch || — || align=right | 2.8 km || 
|-id=151 bgcolor=#E9E9E9
| 396151 ||  || — || September 19, 2001 || Socorro || LINEAR || — || align=right | 2.6 km || 
|-id=152 bgcolor=#d6d6d6
| 396152 ||  || — || October 17, 2006 || Mount Lemmon || Mount Lemmon Survey || — || align=right | 2.5 km || 
|-id=153 bgcolor=#d6d6d6
| 396153 ||  || — || April 4, 2008 || Mount Lemmon || Mount Lemmon Survey || EMA || align=right | 3.2 km || 
|-id=154 bgcolor=#d6d6d6
| 396154 ||  || — || December 12, 2006 || Kitt Peak || Spacewatch || — || align=right | 2.5 km || 
|-id=155 bgcolor=#d6d6d6
| 396155 ||  || — || October 16, 2009 || Mount Lemmon || Mount Lemmon Survey || 3:2 || align=right | 4.5 km || 
|-id=156 bgcolor=#d6d6d6
| 396156 ||  || — || March 13, 2002 || Socorro || LINEAR || (5651) || align=right | 3.3 km || 
|-id=157 bgcolor=#E9E9E9
| 396157 ||  || — || August 18, 2006 || Kitt Peak || Spacewatch || — || align=right | 1.6 km || 
|-id=158 bgcolor=#C2FFFF
| 396158 ||  || — || September 24, 2008 || Kitt Peak || Spacewatch || L4 || align=right | 7.1 km || 
|-id=159 bgcolor=#C2FFFF
| 396159 ||  || — || September 21, 2009 || Mount Lemmon || Mount Lemmon Survey || L4 || align=right | 7.4 km || 
|-id=160 bgcolor=#d6d6d6
| 396160 ||  || — || August 31, 2005 || Kitt Peak || Spacewatch || — || align=right | 2.7 km || 
|-id=161 bgcolor=#d6d6d6
| 396161 ||  || — || March 15, 2004 || Kitt Peak || Spacewatch || — || align=right | 2.8 km || 
|-id=162 bgcolor=#d6d6d6
| 396162 ||  || — || March 11, 2008 || Kitt Peak || Spacewatch || — || align=right | 3.8 km || 
|-id=163 bgcolor=#d6d6d6
| 396163 ||  || — || September 14, 1999 || Kitt Peak || Spacewatch || — || align=right | 3.1 km || 
|-id=164 bgcolor=#d6d6d6
| 396164 ||  || — || February 13, 2002 || Kitt Peak || Spacewatch || — || align=right | 2.6 km || 
|-id=165 bgcolor=#E9E9E9
| 396165 ||  || — || February 28, 2009 || Kitt Peak || Spacewatch || — || align=right | 1.2 km || 
|-id=166 bgcolor=#d6d6d6
| 396166 ||  || — || November 25, 2005 || Catalina || CSS || — || align=right | 3.9 km || 
|-id=167 bgcolor=#d6d6d6
| 396167 ||  || — || October 31, 2005 || Mount Lemmon || Mount Lemmon Survey || — || align=right | 4.0 km || 
|-id=168 bgcolor=#E9E9E9
| 396168 ||  || — || November 18, 2007 || Socorro || LINEAR || EUN || align=right | 1.5 km || 
|-id=169 bgcolor=#d6d6d6
| 396169 ||  || — || September 13, 2005 || Kitt Peak || Spacewatch || — || align=right | 3.3 km || 
|-id=170 bgcolor=#d6d6d6
| 396170 ||  || — || November 6, 2010 || Mount Lemmon || Mount Lemmon Survey || 7:4 || align=right | 5.2 km || 
|-id=171 bgcolor=#d6d6d6
| 396171 ||  || — || August 30, 2005 || Kitt Peak || Spacewatch || — || align=right | 3.0 km || 
|-id=172 bgcolor=#fefefe
| 396172 ||  || — || February 20, 2009 || Kitt Peak || Spacewatch || — || align=right | 1.2 km || 
|-id=173 bgcolor=#d6d6d6
| 396173 ||  || — || April 16, 2008 || Mount Lemmon || Mount Lemmon Survey || — || align=right | 3.7 km || 
|-id=174 bgcolor=#E9E9E9
| 396174 ||  || — || March 31, 2004 || Kitt Peak || Spacewatch || — || align=right | 2.2 km || 
|-id=175 bgcolor=#d6d6d6
| 396175 ||  || — || December 31, 2011 || Mount Lemmon || Mount Lemmon Survey || URS || align=right | 3.6 km || 
|-id=176 bgcolor=#E9E9E9
| 396176 ||  || — || April 20, 2009 || Kitt Peak || Spacewatch || — || align=right | 3.0 km || 
|-id=177 bgcolor=#E9E9E9
| 396177 ||  || — || May 12, 2005 || Kitt Peak || Spacewatch || — || align=right | 1.2 km || 
|-id=178 bgcolor=#d6d6d6
| 396178 ||  || — || January 26, 2007 || Anderson Mesa || LONEOS || — || align=right | 4.2 km || 
|-id=179 bgcolor=#d6d6d6
| 396179 ||  || — || September 22, 2003 || Kitt Peak || Spacewatch || — || align=right | 3.4 km || 
|-id=180 bgcolor=#d6d6d6
| 396180 ||  || — || September 13, 2004 || Kitt Peak || Spacewatch || — || align=right | 2.9 km || 
|-id=181 bgcolor=#d6d6d6
| 396181 ||  || — || October 7, 2004 || Kitt Peak || Spacewatch || — || align=right | 2.9 km || 
|-id=182 bgcolor=#d6d6d6
| 396182 ||  || — || May 1, 1997 || Kitt Peak || Spacewatch || 3:2 || align=right | 5.7 km || 
|-id=183 bgcolor=#d6d6d6
| 396183 ||  || — || September 18, 1998 || Kitt Peak || Spacewatch || — || align=right | 4.5 km || 
|-id=184 bgcolor=#E9E9E9
| 396184 ||  || — || June 1, 1997 || Kitt Peak || Spacewatch || — || align=right | 1.5 km || 
|-id=185 bgcolor=#d6d6d6
| 396185 ||  || — || April 29, 2003 || Kitt Peak || Spacewatch || — || align=right | 3.6 km || 
|-id=186 bgcolor=#d6d6d6
| 396186 ||  || — || November 17, 2006 || Mount Lemmon || Mount Lemmon Survey || — || align=right | 4.3 km || 
|-id=187 bgcolor=#E9E9E9
| 396187 ||  || — || June 4, 1995 || Kitt Peak || Spacewatch || — || align=right | 3.1 km || 
|-id=188 bgcolor=#d6d6d6
| 396188 ||  || — || March 16, 2007 || Kitt Peak || Spacewatch || — || align=right | 3.7 km || 
|-id=189 bgcolor=#d6d6d6
| 396189 ||  || — || May 14, 2008 || Kitt Peak || Spacewatch || EOS || align=right | 2.1 km || 
|-id=190 bgcolor=#d6d6d6
| 396190 ||  || — || December 1, 2005 || Kitt Peak || Spacewatch || EOS || align=right | 1.8 km || 
|-id=191 bgcolor=#d6d6d6
| 396191 ||  || — || October 31, 2010 || Mount Lemmon || Mount Lemmon Survey || EOS || align=right | 2.5 km || 
|-id=192 bgcolor=#E9E9E9
| 396192 ||  || — || July 11, 2005 || Mount Lemmon || Mount Lemmon Survey || — || align=right | 2.8 km || 
|-id=193 bgcolor=#d6d6d6
| 396193 ||  || — || May 8, 2008 || Mount Lemmon || Mount Lemmon Survey || EOS || align=right | 2.6 km || 
|-id=194 bgcolor=#d6d6d6
| 396194 ||  || — || October 11, 2004 || Kitt Peak || Spacewatch || — || align=right | 3.8 km || 
|-id=195 bgcolor=#E9E9E9
| 396195 ||  || — || October 1, 2005 || Kitt Peak || Spacewatch || — || align=right | 2.5 km || 
|-id=196 bgcolor=#d6d6d6
| 396196 ||  || — || March 8, 2006 || Kitt Peak || Spacewatch || — || align=right | 2.8 km || 
|-id=197 bgcolor=#E9E9E9
| 396197 ||  || — || September 26, 2005 || Kitt Peak || Spacewatch || — || align=right | 1.0 km || 
|-id=198 bgcolor=#fefefe
| 396198 ||  || — || June 22, 1995 || Kitt Peak || Spacewatch || ERI || align=right data-sort-value="0.96" | 960 m || 
|-id=199 bgcolor=#d6d6d6
| 396199 ||  || — || March 3, 2006 || Mount Lemmon || Mount Lemmon Survey || EOS || align=right | 2.4 km || 
|-id=200 bgcolor=#fefefe
| 396200 ||  || — || March 7, 2008 || Kitt Peak || Spacewatch || — || align=right | 1.2 km || 
|}

396201–396300 

|-bgcolor=#E9E9E9
| 396201 ||  || — || February 6, 2007 || Mount Lemmon || Mount Lemmon Survey || — || align=right data-sort-value="0.93" | 930 m || 
|-id=202 bgcolor=#d6d6d6
| 396202 ||  || — || November 2, 2008 || Catalina || CSS || TIR || align=right | 3.3 km || 
|-id=203 bgcolor=#fefefe
| 396203 ||  || — || February 28, 2008 || Mount Lemmon || Mount Lemmon Survey || NYS || align=right data-sort-value="0.83" | 830 m || 
|-id=204 bgcolor=#E9E9E9
| 396204 ||  || — || September 21, 2009 || Kitt Peak || Spacewatch || EUN || align=right | 1.4 km || 
|-id=205 bgcolor=#fefefe
| 396205 ||  || — || August 21, 2006 || Kitt Peak || Spacewatch || — || align=right data-sort-value="0.67" | 670 m || 
|-id=206 bgcolor=#E9E9E9
| 396206 ||  || — || October 9, 2004 || Kitt Peak || Spacewatch || AGN || align=right | 1.3 km || 
|-id=207 bgcolor=#d6d6d6
| 396207 ||  || — || April 18, 1999 || Kitt Peak || Spacewatch || — || align=right | 3.6 km || 
|-id=208 bgcolor=#E9E9E9
| 396208 ||  || — || October 29, 2005 || Mount Lemmon || Mount Lemmon Survey || — || align=right | 1.2 km || 
|-id=209 bgcolor=#E9E9E9
| 396209 ||  || — || March 23, 2006 || Catalina || CSS || — || align=right | 3.0 km || 
|-id=210 bgcolor=#fefefe
| 396210 ||  || — || October 12, 2005 || Kitt Peak || Spacewatch || NYS || align=right data-sort-value="0.64" | 640 m || 
|-id=211 bgcolor=#E9E9E9
| 396211 ||  || — || October 28, 2005 || Mount Lemmon || Mount Lemmon Survey || — || align=right | 1.2 km || 
|-id=212 bgcolor=#E9E9E9
| 396212 ||  || — || February 16, 2010 || Catalina || CSS || ADE || align=right | 3.1 km || 
|-id=213 bgcolor=#fefefe
| 396213 ||  || — || December 7, 1999 || Kitt Peak || Spacewatch || — || align=right data-sort-value="0.80" | 800 m || 
|-id=214 bgcolor=#E9E9E9
| 396214 ||  || — || September 22, 2008 || Kitt Peak || Spacewatch || HOF || align=right | 3.4 km || 
|-id=215 bgcolor=#E9E9E9
| 396215 ||  || — || June 21, 2007 || Mount Lemmon || Mount Lemmon Survey || — || align=right data-sort-value="0.96" | 960 m || 
|-id=216 bgcolor=#d6d6d6
| 396216 ||  || — || December 4, 2007 || Catalina || CSS || EOS || align=right | 2.4 km || 
|-id=217 bgcolor=#E9E9E9
| 396217 ||  || — || January 23, 2006 || Kitt Peak || Spacewatch || — || align=right | 1.1 km || 
|-id=218 bgcolor=#d6d6d6
| 396218 ||  || — || November 9, 2007 || Catalina || CSS || — || align=right | 4.2 km || 
|-id=219 bgcolor=#d6d6d6
| 396219 ||  || — || November 18, 2007 || Mount Lemmon || Mount Lemmon Survey || — || align=right | 3.8 km || 
|-id=220 bgcolor=#E9E9E9
| 396220 ||  || — || April 5, 2010 || WISE || WISE || — || align=right | 3.7 km || 
|-id=221 bgcolor=#E9E9E9
| 396221 ||  || — || March 14, 2005 || Mount Lemmon || Mount Lemmon Survey || — || align=right | 2.1 km || 
|-id=222 bgcolor=#E9E9E9
| 396222 ||  || — || September 3, 2008 || Kitt Peak || Spacewatch || KON || align=right | 2.8 km || 
|-id=223 bgcolor=#E9E9E9
| 396223 ||  || — || May 24, 2006 || Kitt Peak || Spacewatch || — || align=right | 1.5 km || 
|-id=224 bgcolor=#d6d6d6
| 396224 ||  || — || January 1, 2009 || Kitt Peak || Spacewatch || — || align=right | 3.5 km || 
|-id=225 bgcolor=#fefefe
| 396225 ||  || — || November 30, 2005 || Kitt Peak || Spacewatch || — || align=right data-sort-value="0.89" | 890 m || 
|-id=226 bgcolor=#d6d6d6
| 396226 ||  || — || December 1, 2008 || Mount Lemmon || Mount Lemmon Survey || — || align=right | 5.3 km || 
|-id=227 bgcolor=#d6d6d6
| 396227 ||  || — || April 16, 2005 || Kitt Peak || Spacewatch || — || align=right | 2.5 km || 
|-id=228 bgcolor=#E9E9E9
| 396228 ||  || — || September 17, 2003 || Kitt Peak || Spacewatch || — || align=right | 1.9 km || 
|-id=229 bgcolor=#d6d6d6
| 396229 ||  || — || December 22, 2008 || Kitt Peak || Spacewatch || — || align=right | 3.1 km || 
|-id=230 bgcolor=#d6d6d6
| 396230 ||  || — || January 13, 2008 || Kitt Peak || Spacewatch || — || align=right | 3.4 km || 
|-id=231 bgcolor=#fefefe
| 396231 ||  || — || December 7, 2005 || Kitt Peak || Spacewatch || — || align=right data-sort-value="0.82" | 820 m || 
|-id=232 bgcolor=#E9E9E9
| 396232 ||  || — || December 15, 2004 || Kitt Peak || Spacewatch || JUN || align=right | 1.0 km || 
|-id=233 bgcolor=#d6d6d6
| 396233 ||  || — || August 27, 2006 || Anderson Mesa || LONEOS || EOS || align=right | 2.1 km || 
|-id=234 bgcolor=#fefefe
| 396234 ||  || — || March 12, 2007 || Catalina || CSS || — || align=right | 1.1 km || 
|-id=235 bgcolor=#d6d6d6
| 396235 ||  || — || November 1, 2008 || Mount Lemmon || Mount Lemmon Survey || — || align=right | 4.2 km || 
|-id=236 bgcolor=#fefefe
| 396236 ||  || — || March 11, 1996 || Kitt Peak || Spacewatch || MAS || align=right data-sort-value="0.81" | 810 m || 
|-id=237 bgcolor=#d6d6d6
| 396237 ||  || — || March 2, 2009 || Kitt Peak || Spacewatch || — || align=right | 3.4 km || 
|-id=238 bgcolor=#fefefe
| 396238 ||  || — || October 30, 2005 || Kitt Peak || Spacewatch || — || align=right data-sort-value="0.81" | 810 m || 
|-id=239 bgcolor=#E9E9E9
| 396239 ||  || — || February 2, 2005 || Kitt Peak || Spacewatch || — || align=right | 2.5 km || 
|-id=240 bgcolor=#E9E9E9
| 396240 ||  || — || January 19, 2001 || Socorro || LINEAR || — || align=right | 2.1 km || 
|-id=241 bgcolor=#d6d6d6
| 396241 ||  || — || March 24, 1998 || Kitt Peak || Spacewatch || EOS || align=right | 2.5 km || 
|-id=242 bgcolor=#fefefe
| 396242 ||  || — || March 24, 2003 || Kitt Peak || Spacewatch || — || align=right data-sort-value="0.77" | 770 m || 
|-id=243 bgcolor=#fefefe
| 396243 ||  || — || March 24, 2003 || Kitt Peak || Spacewatch || — || align=right data-sort-value="0.98" | 980 m || 
|-id=244 bgcolor=#d6d6d6
| 396244 ||  || — || June 30, 2005 || Kitt Peak || Spacewatch || — || align=right | 3.7 km || 
|-id=245 bgcolor=#d6d6d6
| 396245 ||  || — || April 13, 2004 || Kitt Peak || Spacewatch || — || align=right | 2.5 km || 
|-id=246 bgcolor=#d6d6d6
| 396246 ||  || — || June 12, 2004 || Kitt Peak || Spacewatch || — || align=right | 3.8 km || 
|-id=247 bgcolor=#d6d6d6
| 396247 ||  || — || September 26, 2006 || Mount Lemmon || Mount Lemmon Survey || — || align=right | 2.6 km || 
|-id=248 bgcolor=#fefefe
| 396248 ||  || — || November 25, 2005 || Kitt Peak || Spacewatch || — || align=right data-sort-value="0.96" | 960 m || 
|-id=249 bgcolor=#d6d6d6
| 396249 ||  || — || March 17, 2009 || Kitt Peak || Spacewatch || — || align=right | 3.0 km || 
|-id=250 bgcolor=#fefefe
| 396250 ||  || — || October 2, 2008 || Mount Lemmon || Mount Lemmon Survey || — || align=right | 1.0 km || 
|-id=251 bgcolor=#E9E9E9
| 396251 ||  || — || January 15, 2005 || Catalina || CSS || EUN || align=right | 1.5 km || 
|-id=252 bgcolor=#fefefe
| 396252 ||  || — || September 9, 2008 || Mount Lemmon || Mount Lemmon Survey || — || align=right | 1.8 km || 
|-id=253 bgcolor=#d6d6d6
| 396253 ||  || — || April 2, 2009 || Mount Lemmon || Mount Lemmon Survey || — || align=right | 3.2 km || 
|-id=254 bgcolor=#d6d6d6
| 396254 ||  || — || March 28, 2009 || Siding Spring || SSS || — || align=right | 4.3 km || 
|-id=255 bgcolor=#E9E9E9
| 396255 ||  || — || February 25, 2006 || Kitt Peak || Spacewatch || — || align=right | 1.9 km || 
|-id=256 bgcolor=#E9E9E9
| 396256 ||  || — || September 12, 2007 || Mount Lemmon || Mount Lemmon Survey || — || align=right | 1.9 km || 
|-id=257 bgcolor=#d6d6d6
| 396257 ||  || — || February 22, 2009 || Kitt Peak || Spacewatch || EOS || align=right | 2.3 km || 
|-id=258 bgcolor=#E9E9E9
| 396258 ||  || — || April 7, 2006 || Siding Spring || SSS || — || align=right | 2.0 km || 
|-id=259 bgcolor=#d6d6d6
| 396259 ||  || — || March 23, 2004 || Kitt Peak || Spacewatch || — || align=right | 3.3 km || 
|-id=260 bgcolor=#fefefe
| 396260 ||  || — || March 14, 2004 || Kitt Peak || Spacewatch || — || align=right data-sort-value="0.75" | 750 m || 
|-id=261 bgcolor=#fefefe
| 396261 ||  || — || March 29, 2009 || Catalina || CSS || H || align=right data-sort-value="0.98" | 980 m || 
|-id=262 bgcolor=#d6d6d6
| 396262 ||  || — || October 3, 2002 || Campo Imperatore || CINEOS || — || align=right | 3.0 km || 
|-id=263 bgcolor=#d6d6d6
| 396263 ||  || — || January 26, 2003 || Kitt Peak || Spacewatch || EOS || align=right | 2.7 km || 
|-id=264 bgcolor=#d6d6d6
| 396264 ||  || — || October 17, 2006 || Kitt Peak || Spacewatch || EOS || align=right | 2.2 km || 
|-id=265 bgcolor=#d6d6d6
| 396265 ||  || — || August 21, 2006 || Kitt Peak || Spacewatch || — || align=right | 3.1 km || 
|-id=266 bgcolor=#d6d6d6
| 396266 ||  || — || October 1, 2006 || Kitt Peak || Spacewatch || — || align=right | 3.3 km || 
|-id=267 bgcolor=#fefefe
| 396267 ||  || — || March 27, 2004 || Socorro || LINEAR || — || align=right data-sort-value="0.84" | 840 m || 
|-id=268 bgcolor=#d6d6d6
| 396268 ||  || — || August 21, 2006 || Kitt Peak || Spacewatch || EOS || align=right | 2.3 km || 
|-id=269 bgcolor=#d6d6d6
| 396269 ||  || — || March 8, 2003 || Anderson Mesa || LONEOS || — || align=right | 4.1 km || 
|-id=270 bgcolor=#d6d6d6
| 396270 ||  || — || September 30, 2006 || Kitt Peak || Spacewatch || EMA || align=right | 3.9 km || 
|-id=271 bgcolor=#fefefe
| 396271 ||  || — || March 15, 2004 || Kitt Peak || Spacewatch || — || align=right data-sort-value="0.78" | 780 m || 
|-id=272 bgcolor=#d6d6d6
| 396272 ||  || — || August 31, 2005 || Kitt Peak || Spacewatch || — || align=right | 3.8 km || 
|-id=273 bgcolor=#fefefe
| 396273 ||  || — || October 29, 2005 || Mount Lemmon || Mount Lemmon Survey || — || align=right data-sort-value="0.82" | 820 m || 
|-id=274 bgcolor=#E9E9E9
| 396274 ||  || — || October 29, 2008 || Mount Lemmon || Mount Lemmon Survey || — || align=right | 3.0 km || 
|-id=275 bgcolor=#fefefe
| 396275 ||  || — || March 8, 2003 || Kitt Peak || Spacewatch || — || align=right | 1.1 km || 
|-id=276 bgcolor=#E9E9E9
| 396276 ||  || — || September 25, 2008 || Kitt Peak || Spacewatch || (5) || align=right | 2.3 km || 
|-id=277 bgcolor=#E9E9E9
| 396277 ||  || — || April 9, 2002 || Socorro || LINEAR || — || align=right | 1.5 km || 
|-id=278 bgcolor=#fefefe
| 396278 ||  || — || November 17, 2009 || Kitt Peak || Spacewatch || — || align=right data-sort-value="0.86" | 860 m || 
|-id=279 bgcolor=#E9E9E9
| 396279 ||  || — || November 6, 2008 || Kitt Peak || Spacewatch || — || align=right | 2.1 km || 
|-id=280 bgcolor=#d6d6d6
| 396280 ||  || — || March 21, 1998 || Kitt Peak || Spacewatch || — || align=right | 4.8 km || 
|-id=281 bgcolor=#E9E9E9
| 396281 ||  || — || September 13, 2007 || Kitt Peak || Spacewatch || ADE || align=right | 3.0 km || 
|-id=282 bgcolor=#E9E9E9
| 396282 ||  || — || March 17, 2005 || Mount Lemmon || Mount Lemmon Survey ||  || align=right | 1.9 km || 
|-id=283 bgcolor=#fefefe
| 396283 ||  || — || October 24, 2005 || Kitt Peak || Spacewatch || — || align=right data-sort-value="0.88" | 880 m || 
|-id=284 bgcolor=#fefefe
| 396284 ||  || — || October 8, 2008 || Kitt Peak || Spacewatch || — || align=right | 1.0 km || 
|-id=285 bgcolor=#fefefe
| 396285 ||  || — || February 13, 2010 || Catalina || CSS || — || align=right | 1.7 km || 
|-id=286 bgcolor=#E9E9E9
| 396286 ||  || — || February 29, 2000 || Socorro || LINEAR || — || align=right | 2.6 km || 
|-id=287 bgcolor=#E9E9E9
| 396287 ||  || — || April 9, 2010 || Kitt Peak || Spacewatch || — || align=right | 1.6 km || 
|-id=288 bgcolor=#E9E9E9
| 396288 ||  || — || March 25, 2000 || Kitt Peak || Spacewatch || — || align=right | 2.1 km || 
|-id=289 bgcolor=#d6d6d6
| 396289 ||  || — || February 10, 2003 || Kitt Peak || Spacewatch || — || align=right | 3.4 km || 
|-id=290 bgcolor=#E9E9E9
| 396290 ||  || — || March 5, 2006 || Kitt Peak || Spacewatch || (5) || align=right | 1.0 km || 
|-id=291 bgcolor=#fefefe
| 396291 ||  || — || January 28, 2007 || Mount Lemmon || Mount Lemmon Survey || — || align=right data-sort-value="0.99" | 990 m || 
|-id=292 bgcolor=#d6d6d6
| 396292 ||  || — || October 22, 2006 || Kitt Peak || Spacewatch || — || align=right | 2.7 km || 
|-id=293 bgcolor=#d6d6d6
| 396293 ||  || — || January 11, 2008 || Catalina || CSS || EOS || align=right | 2.3 km || 
|-id=294 bgcolor=#C2FFFF
| 396294 ||  || — || February 14, 2002 || Kitt Peak || Spacewatch || L4 || align=right | 8.2 km || 
|-id=295 bgcolor=#fefefe
| 396295 ||  || — || October 26, 2005 || Kitt Peak || Spacewatch || — || align=right data-sort-value="0.77" | 770 m || 
|-id=296 bgcolor=#d6d6d6
| 396296 ||  || — || November 19, 2007 || Kitt Peak || Spacewatch || — || align=right | 2.4 km || 
|-id=297 bgcolor=#E9E9E9
| 396297 ||  || — || February 16, 2010 || Mount Lemmon || Mount Lemmon Survey || — || align=right | 1.8 km || 
|-id=298 bgcolor=#fefefe
| 396298 ||  || — || April 27, 2001 || Kitt Peak || Spacewatch || — || align=right data-sort-value="0.68" | 680 m || 
|-id=299 bgcolor=#E9E9E9
| 396299 ||  || — || March 8, 2005 || Mount Lemmon || Mount Lemmon Survey || — || align=right | 2.4 km || 
|-id=300 bgcolor=#E9E9E9
| 396300 ||  || — || September 16, 2003 || Kitt Peak || Spacewatch || — || align=right | 1.5 km || 
|}

396301–396400 

|-bgcolor=#d6d6d6
| 396301 ||  || — || October 21, 1995 || Kitt Peak || Spacewatch || — || align=right | 3.3 km || 
|-id=302 bgcolor=#d6d6d6
| 396302 ||  || — || November 4, 2007 || Mount Lemmon || Mount Lemmon Survey || EOS || align=right | 2.4 km || 
|-id=303 bgcolor=#fefefe
| 396303 ||  || — || November 4, 2005 || Kitt Peak || Spacewatch || — || align=right | 2.0 km || 
|-id=304 bgcolor=#E9E9E9
| 396304 ||  || — || December 10, 1998 || Kitt Peak || Spacewatch || — || align=right | 2.7 km || 
|-id=305 bgcolor=#E9E9E9
| 396305 ||  || — || March 9, 2005 || Kitt Peak || Spacewatch || — || align=right | 2.6 km || 
|-id=306 bgcolor=#fefefe
| 396306 ||  || — || December 27, 2006 || Mount Lemmon || Mount Lemmon Survey || — || align=right data-sort-value="0.65" | 650 m || 
|-id=307 bgcolor=#E9E9E9
| 396307 ||  || — || December 14, 2004 || Catalina || CSS || — || align=right | 1.4 km || 
|-id=308 bgcolor=#fefefe
| 396308 ||  || — || December 28, 2005 || Kitt Peak || Spacewatch || — || align=right | 1.0 km || 
|-id=309 bgcolor=#E9E9E9
| 396309 ||  || — || March 19, 1996 || Kitt Peak || Spacewatch || — || align=right | 2.6 km || 
|-id=310 bgcolor=#fefefe
| 396310 ||  || — || September 19, 2001 || Kitt Peak || Spacewatch || V || align=right data-sort-value="0.69" | 690 m || 
|-id=311 bgcolor=#d6d6d6
| 396311 ||  || — || September 18, 2011 || Mount Lemmon || Mount Lemmon Survey || — || align=right | 3.2 km || 
|-id=312 bgcolor=#d6d6d6
| 396312 ||  || — || January 19, 2008 || Kitt Peak || Spacewatch || THM || align=right | 2.5 km || 
|-id=313 bgcolor=#d6d6d6
| 396313 ||  || — || January 11, 2008 || Catalina || CSS || URS || align=right | 3.5 km || 
|-id=314 bgcolor=#E9E9E9
| 396314 ||  || — || December 18, 2004 || Mount Lemmon || Mount Lemmon Survey || — || align=right | 1.5 km || 
|-id=315 bgcolor=#E9E9E9
| 396315 ||  || — || February 27, 2006 || Kitt Peak || Spacewatch || — || align=right | 1.2 km || 
|-id=316 bgcolor=#E9E9E9
| 396316 ||  || — || May 6, 2006 || Mount Lemmon || Mount Lemmon Survey || — || align=right data-sort-value="0.92" | 920 m || 
|-id=317 bgcolor=#d6d6d6
| 396317 ||  || — || April 24, 2003 || Kitt Peak || Spacewatch || HYG || align=right | 2.9 km || 
|-id=318 bgcolor=#fefefe
| 396318 ||  || — || October 25, 2005 || Mount Lemmon || Mount Lemmon Survey || — || align=right data-sort-value="0.87" | 870 m || 
|-id=319 bgcolor=#fefefe
| 396319 ||  || — || October 7, 2005 || Kitt Peak || Spacewatch || — || align=right data-sort-value="0.73" | 730 m || 
|-id=320 bgcolor=#E9E9E9
| 396320 ||  || — || April 30, 2006 || Kitt Peak || Spacewatch || — || align=right | 1.3 km || 
|-id=321 bgcolor=#E9E9E9
| 396321 ||  || — || March 13, 1997 || Kitt Peak || Spacewatch || — || align=right | 1.6 km || 
|-id=322 bgcolor=#d6d6d6
| 396322 ||  || — || January 19, 2008 || Mount Lemmon || Mount Lemmon Survey || — || align=right | 2.9 km || 
|-id=323 bgcolor=#E9E9E9
| 396323 ||  || — || August 23, 2007 || Kitt Peak || Spacewatch || — || align=right | 1.9 km || 
|-id=324 bgcolor=#d6d6d6
| 396324 ||  || — || May 19, 2004 || Kitt Peak || Spacewatch || — || align=right | 3.4 km || 
|-id=325 bgcolor=#fefefe
| 396325 ||  || — || October 27, 2005 || Mount Lemmon || Mount Lemmon Survey || — || align=right data-sort-value="0.82" | 820 m || 
|-id=326 bgcolor=#d6d6d6
| 396326 ||  || — || August 30, 2005 || Kitt Peak || Spacewatch || — || align=right | 4.8 km || 
|-id=327 bgcolor=#fefefe
| 396327 ||  || — || September 15, 2004 || Kitt Peak || Spacewatch || — || align=right data-sort-value="0.93" | 930 m || 
|-id=328 bgcolor=#fefefe
| 396328 ||  || — || October 10, 2008 || Mount Lemmon || Mount Lemmon Survey || MAS || align=right data-sort-value="0.74" | 740 m || 
|-id=329 bgcolor=#fefefe
| 396329 ||  || — || February 14, 2010 || Kitt Peak || Spacewatch || — || align=right data-sort-value="0.90" | 900 m || 
|-id=330 bgcolor=#fefefe
| 396330 ||  || — || September 14, 2005 || Kitt Peak || Spacewatch || — || align=right data-sort-value="0.74" | 740 m || 
|-id=331 bgcolor=#d6d6d6
| 396331 ||  || — || May 19, 2004 || Kitt Peak || Spacewatch || — || align=right | 3.7 km || 
|-id=332 bgcolor=#E9E9E9
| 396332 ||  || — || September 29, 2003 || Kitt Peak || Spacewatch || — || align=right | 1.6 km || 
|-id=333 bgcolor=#d6d6d6
| 396333 ||  || — || August 28, 2005 || Kitt Peak || Spacewatch || — || align=right | 3.0 km || 
|-id=334 bgcolor=#fefefe
| 396334 ||  || — || March 29, 2004 || Kitt Peak || Spacewatch || — || align=right data-sort-value="0.75" | 750 m || 
|-id=335 bgcolor=#d6d6d6
| 396335 ||  || — || March 30, 2010 || WISE || WISE || — || align=right | 3.8 km || 
|-id=336 bgcolor=#E9E9E9
| 396336 ||  || — || March 15, 2005 || Kitt Peak || Spacewatch || — || align=right | 2.8 km || 
|-id=337 bgcolor=#fefefe
| 396337 ||  || — || November 1, 2008 || Mount Lemmon || Mount Lemmon Survey || NYS || align=right data-sort-value="0.72" | 720 m || 
|-id=338 bgcolor=#fefefe
| 396338 ||  || — || November 25, 2009 || Kitt Peak || Spacewatch || — || align=right data-sort-value="0.70" | 700 m || 
|-id=339 bgcolor=#E9E9E9
| 396339 ||  || — || November 8, 2007 || Mount Lemmon || Mount Lemmon Survey || — || align=right | 1.5 km || 
|-id=340 bgcolor=#d6d6d6
| 396340 ||  || — || October 21, 2006 || Mount Lemmon || Mount Lemmon Survey || — || align=right | 2.5 km || 
|-id=341 bgcolor=#E9E9E9
| 396341 ||  || — || January 21, 2010 || WISE || WISE || — || align=right | 2.0 km || 
|-id=342 bgcolor=#d6d6d6
| 396342 ||  || — || March 28, 2009 || Kitt Peak || Spacewatch || — || align=right | 2.6 km || 
|-id=343 bgcolor=#fefefe
| 396343 ||  || — || August 29, 2005 || Kitt Peak || Spacewatch || — || align=right data-sort-value="0.80" | 800 m || 
|-id=344 bgcolor=#d6d6d6
| 396344 ||  || — || December 18, 2007 || Mount Lemmon || Mount Lemmon Survey || — || align=right | 3.0 km || 
|-id=345 bgcolor=#fefefe
| 396345 ||  || — || July 30, 2008 || Kitt Peak || Spacewatch || — || align=right data-sort-value="0.97" | 970 m || 
|-id=346 bgcolor=#d6d6d6
| 396346 ||  || — || January 11, 2008 || Catalina || CSS || LIX || align=right | 3.4 km || 
|-id=347 bgcolor=#E9E9E9
| 396347 ||  || — || April 12, 2005 || Mount Lemmon || Mount Lemmon Survey || — || align=right | 2.4 km || 
|-id=348 bgcolor=#E9E9E9
| 396348 ||  || — || November 21, 2007 || Mount Lemmon || Mount Lemmon Survey || — || align=right | 2.6 km || 
|-id=349 bgcolor=#E9E9E9
| 396349 ||  || — || November 19, 2008 || Kitt Peak || Spacewatch || — || align=right | 1.2 km || 
|-id=350 bgcolor=#C2FFFF
| 396350 ||  || — || September 23, 2008 || Kitt Peak || Spacewatch || L4 || align=right | 8.5 km || 
|-id=351 bgcolor=#fefefe
| 396351 ||  || — || March 31, 2003 || Kitt Peak || Spacewatch || — || align=right | 1.0 km || 
|-id=352 bgcolor=#d6d6d6
| 396352 ||  || — || February 8, 2002 || Kitt Peak || Spacewatch || — || align=right | 2.9 km || 
|-id=353 bgcolor=#E9E9E9
| 396353 ||  || — || March 9, 2002 || Kitt Peak || Spacewatch || — || align=right | 1.4 km || 
|-id=354 bgcolor=#d6d6d6
| 396354 ||  || — || December 30, 2007 || Kitt Peak || Spacewatch || — || align=right | 2.5 km || 
|-id=355 bgcolor=#fefefe
| 396355 ||  || — || March 10, 2007 || Kitt Peak || Spacewatch || — || align=right data-sort-value="0.80" | 800 m || 
|-id=356 bgcolor=#fefefe
| 396356 ||  || — || November 16, 2001 || Kitt Peak || Spacewatch || — || align=right data-sort-value="0.80" | 800 m || 
|-id=357 bgcolor=#E9E9E9
| 396357 ||  || — || October 1, 2003 || Kitt Peak || Spacewatch || MAR || align=right | 1.2 km || 
|-id=358 bgcolor=#d6d6d6
| 396358 ||  || — || April 14, 2004 || Kitt Peak || Spacewatch || — || align=right | 2.7 km || 
|-id=359 bgcolor=#d6d6d6
| 396359 ||  || — || March 24, 2003 || Kitt Peak || Spacewatch || — || align=right | 3.7 km || 
|-id=360 bgcolor=#d6d6d6
| 396360 ||  || — || February 10, 1999 || Kitt Peak || Spacewatch || KOR || align=right | 1.7 km || 
|-id=361 bgcolor=#E9E9E9
| 396361 ||  || — || March 18, 2005 || Catalina || CSS || — || align=right | 2.1 km || 
|-id=362 bgcolor=#E9E9E9
| 396362 ||  || — || August 23, 2003 || Campo Imperatore || CINEOS || — || align=right | 2.2 km || 
|-id=363 bgcolor=#fefefe
| 396363 ||  || — || February 25, 2007 || Mount Lemmon || Mount Lemmon Survey || — || align=right | 1.6 km || 
|-id=364 bgcolor=#E9E9E9
| 396364 ||  || — || September 4, 1999 || Kitt Peak || Spacewatch || — || align=right | 2.8 km || 
|-id=365 bgcolor=#fefefe
| 396365 ||  || — || July 30, 2008 || Kitt Peak || Spacewatch || V || align=right data-sort-value="0.66" | 660 m || 
|-id=366 bgcolor=#fefefe
| 396366 ||  || — || March 26, 2003 || Kitt Peak || Spacewatch || — || align=right data-sort-value="0.90" | 900 m || 
|-id=367 bgcolor=#fefefe
| 396367 ||  || — || December 18, 2009 || Mount Lemmon || Mount Lemmon Survey || MAS || align=right data-sort-value="0.75" | 750 m || 
|-id=368 bgcolor=#E9E9E9
| 396368 ||  || — || May 6, 2010 || Mount Lemmon || Mount Lemmon Survey || — || align=right | 2.1 km || 
|-id=369 bgcolor=#fefefe
| 396369 ||  || — || March 11, 2007 || Kitt Peak || Spacewatch || — || align=right data-sort-value="0.95" | 950 m || 
|-id=370 bgcolor=#E9E9E9
| 396370 ||  || — || October 20, 2007 || Catalina || CSS || — || align=right | 2.5 km || 
|-id=371 bgcolor=#E9E9E9
| 396371 ||  || — || April 2, 2006 || Kitt Peak || Spacewatch || — || align=right | 1.2 km || 
|-id=372 bgcolor=#fefefe
| 396372 ||  || — || January 8, 2010 || Kitt Peak || Spacewatch || V || align=right data-sort-value="0.72" | 720 m || 
|-id=373 bgcolor=#E9E9E9
| 396373 ||  || — || December 2, 2008 || Kitt Peak || Spacewatch || — || align=right | 2.2 km || 
|-id=374 bgcolor=#d6d6d6
| 396374 ||  || — || October 28, 1994 || Kitt Peak || Spacewatch || — || align=right | 3.4 km || 
|-id=375 bgcolor=#E9E9E9
| 396375 ||  || — || September 11, 2007 || Mount Lemmon || Mount Lemmon Survey || — || align=right | 1.0 km || 
|-id=376 bgcolor=#d6d6d6
| 396376 ||  || — || December 18, 2001 || Kitt Peak || Spacewatch || — || align=right | 3.8 km || 
|-id=377 bgcolor=#d6d6d6
| 396377 ||  || — || August 21, 2006 || Kitt Peak || Spacewatch || — || align=right | 3.7 km || 
|-id=378 bgcolor=#d6d6d6
| 396378 ||  || — || August 19, 2006 || Kitt Peak || Spacewatch || — || align=right | 4.0 km || 
|-id=379 bgcolor=#fefefe
| 396379 ||  || — || March 7, 2003 || Kitt Peak || Spacewatch || MAS || align=right data-sort-value="0.66" | 660 m || 
|-id=380 bgcolor=#fefefe
| 396380 ||  || — || November 21, 2009 || Mount Lemmon || Mount Lemmon Survey || — || align=right data-sort-value="0.89" | 890 m || 
|-id=381 bgcolor=#d6d6d6
| 396381 ||  || — || August 21, 2001 || Kitt Peak || Spacewatch || — || align=right | 2.9 km || 
|-id=382 bgcolor=#E9E9E9
| 396382 ||  || — || October 8, 2007 || Mount Lemmon || Mount Lemmon Survey || — || align=right | 2.4 km || 
|-id=383 bgcolor=#d6d6d6
| 396383 ||  || — || March 10, 2003 || Kitt Peak || Spacewatch || EOS || align=right | 1.9 km || 
|-id=384 bgcolor=#d6d6d6
| 396384 ||  || — || November 21, 2007 || Mount Lemmon || Mount Lemmon Survey || — || align=right | 2.7 km || 
|-id=385 bgcolor=#fefefe
| 396385 ||  || — || September 22, 2008 || Mount Lemmon || Mount Lemmon Survey || — || align=right | 1.1 km || 
|-id=386 bgcolor=#fefefe
| 396386 ||  || — || December 27, 2005 || Mount Lemmon || Mount Lemmon Survey || MAS || align=right data-sort-value="0.90" | 900 m || 
|-id=387 bgcolor=#fefefe
| 396387 ||  || — || January 7, 1999 || Kitt Peak || Spacewatch || MAS || align=right data-sort-value="0.76" | 760 m || 
|-id=388 bgcolor=#d6d6d6
| 396388 ||  || — || January 31, 2009 || Mount Lemmon || Mount Lemmon Survey || EOS || align=right | 2.2 km || 
|-id=389 bgcolor=#E9E9E9
| 396389 ||  || — || September 4, 2008 || Kitt Peak || Spacewatch || — || align=right | 2.1 km || 
|-id=390 bgcolor=#fefefe
| 396390 ||  || — || March 16, 2007 || Kitt Peak || Spacewatch || V || align=right data-sort-value="0.62" | 620 m || 
|-id=391 bgcolor=#E9E9E9
| 396391 ||  || — || October 29, 1999 || Kitt Peak || Spacewatch || — || align=right | 1.7 km || 
|-id=392 bgcolor=#E9E9E9
| 396392 ||  || — || April 8, 2010 || Kitt Peak || Spacewatch || — || align=right | 1.4 km || 
|-id=393 bgcolor=#d6d6d6
| 396393 ||  || — || March 11, 2008 || Mount Lemmon || Mount Lemmon Survey || Tj (2.95) || align=right | 5.7 km || 
|-id=394 bgcolor=#d6d6d6
| 396394 ||  || — || October 18, 2006 || Kitt Peak || Spacewatch || — || align=right | 2.7 km || 
|-id=395 bgcolor=#C2FFFF
| 396395 ||  || — || September 24, 2008 || Mount Lemmon || Mount Lemmon Survey || L4 || align=right | 7.4 km || 
|-id=396 bgcolor=#fefefe
| 396396 ||  || — || May 2, 2003 || Kitt Peak || Spacewatch || — || align=right data-sort-value="0.73" | 730 m || 
|-id=397 bgcolor=#d6d6d6
| 396397 ||  || — || March 21, 2009 || Kitt Peak || Spacewatch || — || align=right | 2.7 km || 
|-id=398 bgcolor=#E9E9E9
| 396398 ||  || — || September 21, 1998 || Kitt Peak || Spacewatch || GEF || align=right | 1.4 km || 
|-id=399 bgcolor=#E9E9E9
| 396399 ||  || — || March 20, 2001 || Kitt Peak || Spacewatch || — || align=right | 1.5 km || 
|-id=400 bgcolor=#E9E9E9
| 396400 ||  || — || October 24, 2008 || Catalina || CSS || — || align=right | 3.5 km || 
|}

396401–396500 

|-bgcolor=#fefefe
| 396401 ||  || — || December 8, 2005 || Kitt Peak || Spacewatch || — || align=right data-sort-value="0.85" | 850 m || 
|-id=402 bgcolor=#E9E9E9
| 396402 ||  || — || February 4, 2005 || Mount Lemmon || Mount Lemmon Survey || — || align=right | 1.5 km || 
|-id=403 bgcolor=#fefefe
| 396403 ||  || — || October 1, 2008 || Mount Lemmon || Mount Lemmon Survey || — || align=right data-sort-value="0.90" | 900 m || 
|-id=404 bgcolor=#fefefe
| 396404 ||  || — || March 15, 2007 || Mount Lemmon || Mount Lemmon Survey || — || align=right data-sort-value="0.93" | 930 m || 
|-id=405 bgcolor=#C2FFFF
| 396405 ||  || — || September 29, 2009 || Mount Lemmon || Mount Lemmon Survey || L4 || align=right | 9.4 km || 
|-id=406 bgcolor=#fefefe
| 396406 ||  || — || January 28, 2003 || Kitt Peak || Spacewatch || — || align=right data-sort-value="0.89" | 890 m || 
|-id=407 bgcolor=#E9E9E9
| 396407 ||  || — || January 27, 2010 || WISE || WISE || — || align=right | 2.2 km || 
|-id=408 bgcolor=#E9E9E9
| 396408 ||  || — || March 12, 2005 || Mount Lemmon || Mount Lemmon Survey || — || align=right | 2.5 km || 
|-id=409 bgcolor=#C2FFFF
| 396409 ||  || — || August 10, 2007 || Kitt Peak || Spacewatch || L4 || align=right | 9.9 km || 
|-id=410 bgcolor=#E9E9E9
| 396410 ||  || — || November 30, 2003 || Kitt Peak || Spacewatch || — || align=right | 2.0 km || 
|-id=411 bgcolor=#E9E9E9
| 396411 ||  || — || March 13, 2010 || Mount Lemmon || Mount Lemmon Survey || — || align=right | 1.6 km || 
|-id=412 bgcolor=#C2FFFF
| 396412 ||  || — || October 1, 2009 || Mount Lemmon || Mount Lemmon Survey || L4ARK || align=right | 8.9 km || 
|-id=413 bgcolor=#C2FFFF
| 396413 ||  || — || September 16, 2009 || Kitt Peak || Spacewatch || L4 || align=right | 6.9 km || 
|-id=414 bgcolor=#fefefe
| 396414 ||  || — || May 12, 1996 || Kitt Peak || Spacewatch || — || align=right data-sort-value="0.72" | 720 m || 
|-id=415 bgcolor=#d6d6d6
| 396415 ||  || — || April 8, 2003 || Kitt Peak || Spacewatch || — || align=right | 2.9 km || 
|-id=416 bgcolor=#fefefe
| 396416 ||  || — || February 23, 2007 || Kitt Peak || Spacewatch || — || align=right data-sort-value="0.80" | 800 m || 
|-id=417 bgcolor=#fefefe
| 396417 ||  || — || December 20, 2009 || Kitt Peak || Spacewatch || — || align=right data-sort-value="0.72" | 720 m || 
|-id=418 bgcolor=#E9E9E9
| 396418 ||  || — || September 16, 2003 || Kitt Peak || Spacewatch || — || align=right | 1.7 km || 
|-id=419 bgcolor=#E9E9E9
| 396419 ||  || — || September 17, 2012 || Mount Lemmon || Mount Lemmon Survey || — || align=right | 1.4 km || 
|-id=420 bgcolor=#fefefe
| 396420 ||  || — || October 29, 2008 || Kitt Peak || Spacewatch || — || align=right | 2.2 km || 
|-id=421 bgcolor=#E9E9E9
| 396421 ||  || — || October 9, 2007 || Mount Lemmon || Mount Lemmon Survey || — || align=right | 2.4 km || 
|-id=422 bgcolor=#E9E9E9
| 396422 ||  || — || September 18, 2006 || Catalina || CSS || — || align=right | 2.6 km || 
|-id=423 bgcolor=#fefefe
| 396423 ||  || — || May 11, 2004 || Anderson Mesa || LONEOS || — || align=right data-sort-value="0.77" | 770 m || 
|-id=424 bgcolor=#d6d6d6
| 396424 ||  || — || March 21, 2004 || Kitt Peak || Spacewatch || — || align=right | 2.7 km || 
|-id=425 bgcolor=#fefefe
| 396425 ||  || — || December 14, 2001 || Kitt Peak || Spacewatch || — || align=right | 1.0 km || 
|-id=426 bgcolor=#fefefe
| 396426 ||  || — || February 10, 2010 || Kitt Peak || Spacewatch || V || align=right data-sort-value="0.80" | 800 m || 
|-id=427 bgcolor=#fefefe
| 396427 ||  || — || March 10, 2003 || Anderson Mesa || LONEOS || MAS || align=right data-sort-value="0.86" | 860 m || 
|-id=428 bgcolor=#d6d6d6
| 396428 ||  || — || March 24, 2003 || Kitt Peak || Spacewatch || EOS || align=right | 2.3 km || 
|-id=429 bgcolor=#E9E9E9
| 396429 ||  || — || January 16, 2004 || Kitt Peak || Spacewatch || — || align=right | 2.7 km || 
|-id=430 bgcolor=#E9E9E9
| 396430 ||  || — || November 30, 2008 || Mount Lemmon || Mount Lemmon Survey || — || align=right data-sort-value="0.89" | 890 m || 
|-id=431 bgcolor=#E9E9E9
| 396431 ||  || — || February 19, 2001 || Kitt Peak || Spacewatch || — || align=right | 1.2 km || 
|-id=432 bgcolor=#fefefe
| 396432 ||  || — || July 29, 2008 || Kitt Peak || Spacewatch || — || align=right data-sort-value="0.70" | 700 m || 
|-id=433 bgcolor=#d6d6d6
| 396433 ||  || — || October 24, 2005 || Kitt Peak || Spacewatch || — || align=right | 3.8 km || 
|-id=434 bgcolor=#d6d6d6
| 396434 ||  || — || October 4, 2006 || Mount Lemmon || Mount Lemmon Survey || — || align=right | 3.6 km || 
|-id=435 bgcolor=#E9E9E9
| 396435 ||  || — || March 10, 2005 || Kitt Peak || Spacewatch || — || align=right | 2.1 km || 
|-id=436 bgcolor=#FA8072
| 396436 ||  || — || May 8, 2003 || Socorro || LINEAR || — || align=right data-sort-value="0.85" | 850 m || 
|-id=437 bgcolor=#fefefe
| 396437 ||  || — || October 25, 2008 || Mount Lemmon || Mount Lemmon Survey || — || align=right | 2.2 km || 
|-id=438 bgcolor=#fefefe
| 396438 ||  || — || March 26, 2003 || Kitt Peak || Spacewatch || — || align=right | 1.1 km || 
|-id=439 bgcolor=#E9E9E9
| 396439 ||  || — || March 2, 1997 || Kitt Peak || Spacewatch || — || align=right | 2.5 km || 
|-id=440 bgcolor=#E9E9E9
| 396440 ||  || — || November 18, 1995 || Kitt Peak || Spacewatch || — || align=right | 2.0 km || 
|-id=441 bgcolor=#E9E9E9
| 396441 ||  || — || October 12, 2007 || Mount Lemmon || Mount Lemmon Survey || — || align=right | 2.0 km || 
|-id=442 bgcolor=#d6d6d6
| 396442 ||  || — || June 13, 2005 || Mount Lemmon || Mount Lemmon Survey || BRA || align=right | 2.0 km || 
|-id=443 bgcolor=#d6d6d6
| 396443 ||  || — || August 22, 2004 || Kitt Peak || Spacewatch || — || align=right | 3.3 km || 
|-id=444 bgcolor=#E9E9E9
| 396444 ||  || — || February 24, 2006 || Mount Lemmon || Mount Lemmon Survey || — || align=right data-sort-value="0.80" | 800 m || 
|-id=445 bgcolor=#d6d6d6
| 396445 ||  || — || September 19, 2006 || Kitt Peak || Spacewatch || — || align=right | 2.9 km || 
|-id=446 bgcolor=#fefefe
| 396446 ||  || — || March 23, 2003 || Kitt Peak || Spacewatch || NYS || align=right data-sort-value="0.69" | 690 m || 
|-id=447 bgcolor=#fefefe
| 396447 ||  || — || September 23, 2008 || Kitt Peak || Spacewatch || — || align=right | 2.7 km || 
|-id=448 bgcolor=#E9E9E9
| 396448 ||  || — || March 12, 2005 || Kitt Peak || Spacewatch || — || align=right | 2.4 km || 
|-id=449 bgcolor=#fefefe
| 396449 ||  || — || September 29, 2000 || Xinglong || SCAP || — || align=right data-sort-value="0.90" | 900 m || 
|-id=450 bgcolor=#E9E9E9
| 396450 ||  || — || December 1, 2008 || Catalina || CSS || — || align=right | 4.2 km || 
|-id=451 bgcolor=#d6d6d6
| 396451 ||  || — || November 4, 2007 || Kitt Peak || Spacewatch || KOR || align=right | 1.4 km || 
|-id=452 bgcolor=#d6d6d6
| 396452 ||  || — || March 18, 2009 || Kitt Peak || Spacewatch || — || align=right | 2.6 km || 
|-id=453 bgcolor=#E9E9E9
| 396453 ||  || — || April 12, 1996 || Kitt Peak || Spacewatch || — || align=right | 2.4 km || 
|-id=454 bgcolor=#fefefe
| 396454 ||  || — || March 15, 2007 || Mount Lemmon || Mount Lemmon Survey || — || align=right | 2.2 km || 
|-id=455 bgcolor=#fefefe
| 396455 ||  || — || February 1, 2003 || Kitt Peak || Spacewatch || MAS || align=right data-sort-value="0.74" | 740 m || 
|-id=456 bgcolor=#d6d6d6
| 396456 ||  || — || September 26, 2005 || Kitt Peak || Spacewatch || THM || align=right | 2.3 km || 
|-id=457 bgcolor=#d6d6d6
| 396457 ||  || — || February 9, 2008 || Kitt Peak || Spacewatch || — || align=right | 2.9 km || 
|-id=458 bgcolor=#fefefe
| 396458 ||  || — || September 29, 2005 || Mount Lemmon || Mount Lemmon Survey || — || align=right data-sort-value="0.74" | 740 m || 
|-id=459 bgcolor=#d6d6d6
| 396459 ||  || — || August 10, 2005 || Siding Spring || SSS || — || align=right | 4.0 km || 
|-id=460 bgcolor=#E9E9E9
| 396460 ||  || — || May 29, 2003 || Kitt Peak || Spacewatch || — || align=right | 1.6 km || 
|-id=461 bgcolor=#fefefe
| 396461 ||  || — || March 14, 2007 || Mount Lemmon || Mount Lemmon Survey || — || align=right data-sort-value="0.83" | 830 m || 
|-id=462 bgcolor=#fefefe
| 396462 ||  || — || March 12, 2000 || Kitt Peak || Spacewatch || — || align=right | 1.1 km || 
|-id=463 bgcolor=#E9E9E9
| 396463 ||  || — || June 21, 2010 || WISE || WISE || — || align=right | 2.3 km || 
|-id=464 bgcolor=#d6d6d6
| 396464 ||  || — || February 11, 2008 || Kitt Peak || Spacewatch || LIX || align=right | 4.5 km || 
|-id=465 bgcolor=#E9E9E9
| 396465 ||  || — || September 13, 2007 || Mount Lemmon || Mount Lemmon Survey || — || align=right | 1.7 km || 
|-id=466 bgcolor=#fefefe
| 396466 ||  || — || December 4, 2005 || Kitt Peak || Spacewatch || MAS || align=right data-sort-value="0.65" | 650 m || 
|-id=467 bgcolor=#d6d6d6
| 396467 ||  || — || September 3, 1999 || Kitt Peak || Spacewatch || — || align=right | 3.7 km || 
|-id=468 bgcolor=#E9E9E9
| 396468 ||  || — || November 2, 2008 || Mount Lemmon || Mount Lemmon Survey || (5) || align=right | 1.0 km || 
|-id=469 bgcolor=#fefefe
| 396469 ||  || — || January 8, 2006 || Mount Lemmon || Mount Lemmon Survey || V || align=right data-sort-value="0.99" | 990 m || 
|-id=470 bgcolor=#E9E9E9
| 396470 ||  || — || July 12, 2010 || WISE || WISE || — || align=right | 2.1 km || 
|-id=471 bgcolor=#E9E9E9
| 396471 ||  || — || April 15, 2001 || Kitt Peak || Spacewatch || — || align=right | 2.0 km || 
|-id=472 bgcolor=#fefefe
| 396472 ||  || — || December 5, 2005 || Mount Lemmon || Mount Lemmon Survey || NYS || align=right data-sort-value="0.69" | 690 m || 
|-id=473 bgcolor=#E9E9E9
| 396473 ||  || — || December 20, 2004 || Mount Lemmon || Mount Lemmon Survey || — || align=right | 1.5 km || 
|-id=474 bgcolor=#E9E9E9
| 396474 ||  || — || February 3, 2009 || Kitt Peak || Spacewatch || NEM || align=right | 2.4 km || 
|-id=475 bgcolor=#E9E9E9
| 396475 ||  || — || March 11, 2005 || Kitt Peak || Spacewatch || — || align=right | 1.8 km || 
|-id=476 bgcolor=#fefefe
| 396476 ||  || — || September 16, 2003 || Kitt Peak || Spacewatch || — || align=right | 1.0 km || 
|-id=477 bgcolor=#E9E9E9
| 396477 ||  || — || September 30, 2003 || Kitt Peak || Spacewatch || — || align=right | 1.8 km || 
|-id=478 bgcolor=#E9E9E9
| 396478 ||  || — || January 13, 2005 || Kitt Peak || Spacewatch || — || align=right | 1.5 km || 
|-id=479 bgcolor=#fefefe
| 396479 ||  || — || April 7, 2003 || Kitt Peak || Spacewatch || — || align=right data-sort-value="0.89" | 890 m || 
|-id=480 bgcolor=#fefefe
| 396480 ||  || — || May 29, 2003 || Kitt Peak || Spacewatch || — || align=right | 1.0 km || 
|-id=481 bgcolor=#d6d6d6
| 396481 ||  || — || February 20, 2009 || Kitt Peak || Spacewatch || — || align=right | 2.4 km || 
|-id=482 bgcolor=#d6d6d6
| 396482 ||  || — || January 18, 2008 || Mount Lemmon || Mount Lemmon Survey || — || align=right | 3.4 km || 
|-id=483 bgcolor=#fefefe
| 396483 ||  || — || April 25, 2007 || Mount Lemmon || Mount Lemmon Survey || — || align=right data-sort-value="0.79" | 790 m || 
|-id=484 bgcolor=#E9E9E9
| 396484 ||  || — || October 8, 2008 || Mount Lemmon || Mount Lemmon Survey || — || align=right | 1.3 km || 
|-id=485 bgcolor=#E9E9E9
| 396485 ||  || — || March 18, 2010 || Kitt Peak || Spacewatch || — || align=right | 1.1 km || 
|-id=486 bgcolor=#fefefe
| 396486 ||  || — || March 21, 2001 || Kitt Peak || Spacewatch || — || align=right data-sort-value="0.82" | 820 m || 
|-id=487 bgcolor=#E9E9E9
| 396487 ||  || — || April 7, 2010 || Mount Lemmon || Mount Lemmon Survey || — || align=right | 2.3 km || 
|-id=488 bgcolor=#E9E9E9
| 396488 ||  || — || March 25, 2006 || Catalina || CSS || — || align=right | 2.6 km || 
|-id=489 bgcolor=#d6d6d6
| 396489 ||  || — || March 27, 2003 || Kitt Peak || Spacewatch || — || align=right | 4.1 km || 
|-id=490 bgcolor=#d6d6d6
| 396490 ||  || — || May 2, 2003 || Kitt Peak || Spacewatch || — || align=right | 3.6 km || 
|-id=491 bgcolor=#E9E9E9
| 396491 ||  || — || March 30, 1992 || Kitt Peak || Spacewatch || — || align=right | 3.1 km || 
|-id=492 bgcolor=#fefefe
| 396492 ||  || — || March 15, 2007 || Mount Lemmon || Mount Lemmon Survey || — || align=right | 1.2 km || 
|-id=493 bgcolor=#E9E9E9
| 396493 ||  || — || April 2, 2005 || Catalina || CSS || — || align=right | 2.2 km || 
|-id=494 bgcolor=#fefefe
| 396494 ||  || — || March 24, 2003 || Kitt Peak || Spacewatch || NYS || align=right data-sort-value="0.82" | 820 m || 
|-id=495 bgcolor=#fefefe
| 396495 ||  || — || April 4, 2003 || Kitt Peak || Spacewatch || — || align=right data-sort-value="0.85" | 850 m || 
|-id=496 bgcolor=#fefefe
| 396496 ||  || — || March 19, 2004 || Socorro || LINEAR || — || align=right data-sort-value="0.87" | 870 m || 
|-id=497 bgcolor=#fefefe
| 396497 ||  || — || April 8, 2003 || Kitt Peak || Spacewatch || MAS || align=right data-sort-value="0.76" | 760 m || 
|-id=498 bgcolor=#d6d6d6
| 396498 ||  || — || March 23, 2003 || Kitt Peak || Spacewatch || TIR || align=right | 2.4 km || 
|-id=499 bgcolor=#E9E9E9
| 396499 ||  || — || May 17, 2010 || Mount Lemmon || Mount Lemmon Survey || — || align=right | 1.3 km || 
|-id=500 bgcolor=#E9E9E9
| 396500 ||  || — || March 23, 2006 || Kitt Peak || Spacewatch || — || align=right | 1.2 km || 
|}

396501–396600 

|-bgcolor=#E9E9E9
| 396501 ||  || — || April 30, 2006 || Catalina || CSS || — || align=right | 2.1 km || 
|-id=502 bgcolor=#fefefe
| 396502 ||  || — || March 29, 2004 || Catalina || CSS || — || align=right data-sort-value="0.78" | 780 m || 
|-id=503 bgcolor=#fefefe
| 396503 ||  || — || November 8, 2008 || Kitt Peak || Spacewatch || — || align=right | 2.6 km || 
|-id=504 bgcolor=#fefefe
| 396504 ||  || — || March 17, 2004 || Kitt Peak || Spacewatch || — || align=right data-sort-value="0.74" | 740 m || 
|-id=505 bgcolor=#d6d6d6
| 396505 ||  || — || October 8, 2005 || Kitt Peak || Spacewatch || — || align=right | 3.0 km || 
|-id=506 bgcolor=#d6d6d6
| 396506 ||  || — || April 19, 2004 || Kitt Peak || Spacewatch || — || align=right | 3.6 km || 
|-id=507 bgcolor=#E9E9E9
| 396507 ||  || — || March 7, 2005 || Socorro || LINEAR || — || align=right | 2.1 km || 
|-id=508 bgcolor=#d6d6d6
| 396508 ||  || — || January 19, 2008 || Mount Lemmon || Mount Lemmon Survey || — || align=right | 3.5 km || 
|-id=509 bgcolor=#E9E9E9
| 396509 ||  || — || April 6, 2010 || Kitt Peak || Spacewatch || — || align=right | 2.4 km || 
|-id=510 bgcolor=#fefefe
| 396510 ||  || — || February 9, 2010 || Mount Lemmon || Mount Lemmon Survey || NYS || align=right data-sort-value="0.71" | 710 m || 
|-id=511 bgcolor=#E9E9E9
| 396511 ||  || — || January 13, 2005 || Kitt Peak || Spacewatch || — || align=right | 2.0 km || 
|-id=512 bgcolor=#fefefe
| 396512 ||  || — || April 15, 2010 || WISE || WISE || — || align=right | 1.8 km || 
|-id=513 bgcolor=#fefefe
| 396513 ||  || — || April 5, 2003 || Kitt Peak || Spacewatch || — || align=right data-sort-value="0.76" | 760 m || 
|-id=514 bgcolor=#E9E9E9
| 396514 ||  || — || March 22, 2001 || Kitt Peak || Spacewatch || EUN || align=right | 1.5 km || 
|-id=515 bgcolor=#E9E9E9
| 396515 ||  || — || May 6, 2010 || Mount Lemmon || Mount Lemmon Survey || — || align=right | 1.1 km || 
|-id=516 bgcolor=#E9E9E9
| 396516 ||  || — || September 13, 2007 || Mount Lemmon || Mount Lemmon Survey || — || align=right | 2.1 km || 
|-id=517 bgcolor=#fefefe
| 396517 ||  || — || April 30, 2003 || Kitt Peak || Spacewatch || — || align=right | 1.8 km || 
|-id=518 bgcolor=#E9E9E9
| 396518 ||  || — || April 30, 2006 || Kitt Peak || Spacewatch || (5) || align=right data-sort-value="0.86" | 860 m || 
|-id=519 bgcolor=#d6d6d6
| 396519 ||  || — || January 18, 2008 || Mount Lemmon || Mount Lemmon Survey || TEL || align=right | 3.3 km || 
|-id=520 bgcolor=#E9E9E9
| 396520 ||  || — || February 20, 2010 || WISE || WISE || ADE || align=right | 1.8 km || 
|-id=521 bgcolor=#fefefe
| 396521 ||  || — || March 6, 2003 || Anderson Mesa || LONEOS || NYS || align=right data-sort-value="0.76" | 760 m || 
|-id=522 bgcolor=#E9E9E9
| 396522 ||  || — || March 4, 2005 || Mount Lemmon || Mount Lemmon Survey || MIS || align=right | 2.3 km || 
|-id=523 bgcolor=#E9E9E9
| 396523 ||  || — || October 12, 2007 || Mount Lemmon || Mount Lemmon Survey || — || align=right | 1.7 km || 
|-id=524 bgcolor=#fefefe
| 396524 ||  || — || April 19, 2004 || Socorro || LINEAR || — || align=right data-sort-value="0.78" | 780 m || 
|-id=525 bgcolor=#fefefe
| 396525 ||  || — || January 31, 2006 || Kitt Peak || Spacewatch || NYS || align=right data-sort-value="0.64" | 640 m || 
|-id=526 bgcolor=#E9E9E9
| 396526 ||  || — || October 10, 1999 || Kitt Peak || Spacewatch || EUN || align=right | 1.5 km || 
|-id=527 bgcolor=#fefefe
| 396527 ||  || — || April 21, 2004 || Kitt Peak || Spacewatch || — || align=right data-sort-value="0.68" | 680 m || 
|-id=528 bgcolor=#E9E9E9
| 396528 ||  || — || September 30, 1995 || Kitt Peak || Spacewatch || — || align=right | 1.6 km || 
|-id=529 bgcolor=#fefefe
| 396529 ||  || — || May 10, 2003 || Kitt Peak || Spacewatch || NYS || align=right data-sort-value="0.64" | 640 m || 
|-id=530 bgcolor=#fefefe
| 396530 ||  || — || September 23, 2008 || Mount Lemmon || Mount Lemmon Survey || — || align=right data-sort-value="0.77" | 770 m || 
|-id=531 bgcolor=#d6d6d6
| 396531 ||  || — || March 10, 2003 || Anderson Mesa || LONEOS || — || align=right | 3.4 km || 
|-id=532 bgcolor=#fefefe
| 396532 ||  || — || December 27, 2006 || Mount Lemmon || Mount Lemmon Survey || — || align=right data-sort-value="0.78" | 780 m || 
|-id=533 bgcolor=#E9E9E9
| 396533 ||  || — || May 21, 2006 || Kitt Peak || Spacewatch || HNS || align=right | 1.4 km || 
|-id=534 bgcolor=#d6d6d6
| 396534 ||  || — || April 25, 2003 || Anderson Mesa || LONEOS || — || align=right | 5.0 km || 
|-id=535 bgcolor=#E9E9E9
| 396535 ||  || — || March 8, 2005 || Catalina || CSS || — || align=right | 1.7 km || 
|-id=536 bgcolor=#fefefe
| 396536 ||  || — || November 25, 2005 || Mount Lemmon || Mount Lemmon Survey || — || align=right data-sort-value="0.73" | 730 m || 
|-id=537 bgcolor=#fefefe
| 396537 ||  || — || January 7, 2006 || Kitt Peak || Spacewatch || — || align=right | 2.2 km || 
|-id=538 bgcolor=#fefefe
| 396538 ||  || — || July 10, 2007 || Siding Spring || SSS || — || align=right | 1.5 km || 
|-id=539 bgcolor=#fefefe
| 396539 || 6283 P-L || — || September 24, 1960 || Palomar || PLS || NYS || align=right data-sort-value="0.76" | 760 m || 
|-id=540 bgcolor=#fefefe
| 396540 ||  || — || May 10, 1986 || Kitt Peak || Spacewatch || H || align=right data-sort-value="0.77" | 770 m || 
|-id=541 bgcolor=#d6d6d6
| 396541 ||  || — || September 28, 1994 || Kitt Peak || Spacewatch || — || align=right | 2.8 km || 
|-id=542 bgcolor=#d6d6d6
| 396542 ||  || — || October 28, 1994 || Kitt Peak || Spacewatch || EOS || align=right | 2.1 km || 
|-id=543 bgcolor=#E9E9E9
| 396543 ||  || — || January 13, 1996 || Kitt Peak || Spacewatch || — || align=right | 1.5 km || 
|-id=544 bgcolor=#d6d6d6
| 396544 ||  || — || January 20, 1996 || Kitt Peak || Spacewatch || — || align=right | 2.0 km || 
|-id=545 bgcolor=#fefefe
| 396545 ||  || — || May 9, 1996 || Kitt Peak || Spacewatch || NYS || align=right data-sort-value="0.67" | 670 m || 
|-id=546 bgcolor=#fefefe
| 396546 ||  || — || November 10, 1996 || Kitt Peak || Spacewatch || — || align=right data-sort-value="0.60" | 600 m || 
|-id=547 bgcolor=#fefefe
| 396547 ||  || — || May 3, 1997 || Kitt Peak || Spacewatch || — || align=right data-sort-value="0.78" | 780 m || 
|-id=548 bgcolor=#fefefe
| 396548 ||  || — || September 6, 1997 || Caussols || ODAS || — || align=right data-sort-value="0.86" | 860 m || 
|-id=549 bgcolor=#fefefe
| 396549 ||  || — || June 16, 1998 || Kitt Peak || Spacewatch || — || align=right | 1.1 km || 
|-id=550 bgcolor=#E9E9E9
| 396550 ||  || — || August 26, 1998 || Xinglong || SCAP || (5) || align=right data-sort-value="0.95" | 950 m || 
|-id=551 bgcolor=#d6d6d6
| 396551 ||  || — || August 24, 1998 || Socorro || LINEAR || — || align=right | 3.2 km || 
|-id=552 bgcolor=#E9E9E9
| 396552 ||  || — || September 14, 1998 || Socorro || LINEAR || — || align=right | 1.4 km || 
|-id=553 bgcolor=#d6d6d6
| 396553 ||  || — || September 19, 1998 || Socorro || LINEAR || — || align=right | 5.1 km || 
|-id=554 bgcolor=#E9E9E9
| 396554 ||  || — || November 15, 1998 || Kitt Peak || Spacewatch || EUN || align=right | 1.4 km || 
|-id=555 bgcolor=#fefefe
| 396555 ||  || — || March 20, 1999 || Apache Point || SDSS || — || align=right data-sort-value="0.56" | 560 m || 
|-id=556 bgcolor=#fefefe
| 396556 ||  || — || October 5, 1999 || Socorro || LINEAR || H || align=right data-sort-value="0.76" | 760 m || 
|-id=557 bgcolor=#d6d6d6
| 396557 ||  || — || October 11, 1999 || Kitt Peak || Spacewatch || — || align=right | 2.7 km || 
|-id=558 bgcolor=#d6d6d6
| 396558 ||  || — || October 12, 1999 || Socorro || LINEAR || TIR || align=right | 3.9 km || 
|-id=559 bgcolor=#d6d6d6
| 396559 ||  || — || October 10, 1999 || Socorro || LINEAR || — || align=right | 3.7 km || 
|-id=560 bgcolor=#E9E9E9
| 396560 ||  || — || October 2, 1999 || Kitt Peak || Spacewatch || — || align=right data-sort-value="0.77" | 770 m || 
|-id=561 bgcolor=#d6d6d6
| 396561 ||  || — || October 2, 1999 || Kitt Peak || Spacewatch || — || align=right | 2.8 km || 
|-id=562 bgcolor=#fefefe
| 396562 ||  || — || October 11, 1999 || Kitt Peak || Spacewatch || — || align=right data-sort-value="0.65" | 650 m || 
|-id=563 bgcolor=#d6d6d6
| 396563 ||  || — || October 31, 1999 || Kitt Peak || Spacewatch || — || align=right | 2.1 km || 
|-id=564 bgcolor=#fefefe
| 396564 ||  || — || November 9, 1999 || Socorro || LINEAR || H || align=right data-sort-value="0.86" | 860 m || 
|-id=565 bgcolor=#fefefe
| 396565 ||  || — || November 9, 1999 || Socorro || LINEAR || H || align=right data-sort-value="0.59" | 590 m || 
|-id=566 bgcolor=#fefefe
| 396566 ||  || — || November 12, 1999 || Socorro || LINEAR || — || align=right data-sort-value="0.89" | 890 m || 
|-id=567 bgcolor=#d6d6d6
| 396567 ||  || — || December 31, 1999 || Kitt Peak || Spacewatch || 3:2 || align=right | 4.7 km || 
|-id=568 bgcolor=#FA8072
| 396568 ||  || — || January 5, 2000 || Socorro || LINEAR || — || align=right | 2.3 km || 
|-id=569 bgcolor=#E9E9E9
| 396569 ||  || — || February 28, 2000 || Kitt Peak || Spacewatch || — || align=right | 2.6 km || 
|-id=570 bgcolor=#fefefe
| 396570 ||  || — || February 27, 2000 || Kitt Peak || Spacewatch || — || align=right data-sort-value="0.65" | 650 m || 
|-id=571 bgcolor=#fefefe
| 396571 ||  || — || March 5, 2000 || Socorro || LINEAR || — || align=right | 1.1 km || 
|-id=572 bgcolor=#fefefe
| 396572 ||  || — || April 6, 2000 || Kitt Peak || Spacewatch || — || align=right data-sort-value="0.62" | 620 m || 
|-id=573 bgcolor=#E9E9E9
| 396573 ||  || — || April 3, 2000 || Kitt Peak || Spacewatch || — || align=right | 1.9 km || 
|-id=574 bgcolor=#fefefe
| 396574 ||  || — || April 29, 2000 || Socorro || LINEAR || — || align=right data-sort-value="0.82" | 820 m || 
|-id=575 bgcolor=#E9E9E9
| 396575 ||  || — || May 1, 2000 || Kitt Peak || Spacewatch || — || align=right | 2.4 km || 
|-id=576 bgcolor=#d6d6d6
| 396576 ||  || — || May 7, 2000 || Socorro || LINEAR || — || align=right | 3.8 km || 
|-id=577 bgcolor=#fefefe
| 396577 ||  || — || May 24, 2000 || Kitt Peak || Spacewatch || — || align=right data-sort-value="0.90" | 900 m || 
|-id=578 bgcolor=#FA8072
| 396578 ||  || — || August 28, 2000 || Socorro || LINEAR || — || align=right data-sort-value="0.97" | 970 m || 
|-id=579 bgcolor=#fefefe
| 396579 ||  || — || August 31, 2000 || Socorro || LINEAR || — || align=right | 1.1 km || 
|-id=580 bgcolor=#fefefe
| 396580 ||  || — || August 31, 2000 || Socorro || LINEAR || — || align=right data-sort-value="0.94" | 940 m || 
|-id=581 bgcolor=#fefefe
| 396581 ||  || — || September 2, 2000 || Haleakala || NEAT || — || align=right | 1.3 km || 
|-id=582 bgcolor=#d6d6d6
| 396582 ||  || — || September 8, 2000 || Kitt Peak || Spacewatch || — || align=right | 3.0 km || 
|-id=583 bgcolor=#fefefe
| 396583 ||  || — || September 19, 2000 || Kitt Peak || Spacewatch || — || align=right data-sort-value="0.75" | 750 m || 
|-id=584 bgcolor=#fefefe
| 396584 ||  || — || September 22, 2000 || Socorro || LINEAR || — || align=right | 1.1 km || 
|-id=585 bgcolor=#fefefe
| 396585 ||  || — || September 24, 2000 || Socorro || LINEAR || — || align=right | 1.1 km || 
|-id=586 bgcolor=#fefefe
| 396586 ||  || — || October 3, 2000 || Socorro || LINEAR || — || align=right | 1.4 km || 
|-id=587 bgcolor=#d6d6d6
| 396587 ||  || — || October 24, 2000 || Socorro || LINEAR || — || align=right | 3.6 km || 
|-id=588 bgcolor=#E9E9E9
| 396588 ||  || — || January 19, 2001 || Socorro || LINEAR || — || align=right | 1.2 km || 
|-id=589 bgcolor=#E9E9E9
| 396589 ||  || — || February 5, 2001 || Socorro || LINEAR || — || align=right | 2.3 km || 
|-id=590 bgcolor=#E9E9E9
| 396590 ||  || — || March 4, 2001 || Socorro || LINEAR || — || align=right | 1.8 km || 
|-id=591 bgcolor=#E9E9E9
| 396591 ||  || — || March 24, 2001 || Socorro || LINEAR || — || align=right | 1.5 km || 
|-id=592 bgcolor=#E9E9E9
| 396592 ||  || — || March 23, 2001 || Anderson Mesa || LONEOS || — || align=right | 1.5 km || 
|-id=593 bgcolor=#FFC2E0
| 396593 ||  || — || April 16, 2001 || Socorro || LINEAR || ATEcritical || align=right data-sort-value="0.56" | 560 m || 
|-id=594 bgcolor=#E9E9E9
| 396594 ||  || — || June 18, 2001 || Palomar || NEAT || — || align=right | 2.4 km || 
|-id=595 bgcolor=#fefefe
| 396595 ||  || — || July 20, 2001 || Palomar || NEAT || — || align=right data-sort-value="0.87" | 870 m || 
|-id=596 bgcolor=#E9E9E9
| 396596 ||  || — || July 22, 2001 || Socorro || LINEAR || — || align=right | 2.8 km || 
|-id=597 bgcolor=#E9E9E9
| 396597 ||  || — || August 10, 2001 || Palomar || NEAT || EUN || align=right | 1.4 km || 
|-id=598 bgcolor=#fefefe
| 396598 ||  || — || August 10, 2001 || Palomar || NEAT || — || align=right data-sort-value="0.94" | 940 m || 
|-id=599 bgcolor=#E9E9E9
| 396599 ||  || — || August 11, 2001 || Palomar || NEAT || — || align=right | 4.0 km || 
|-id=600 bgcolor=#fefefe
| 396600 ||  || — || August 14, 2001 || Haleakala || NEAT || — || align=right data-sort-value="0.80" | 800 m || 
|}

396601–396700 

|-bgcolor=#E9E9E9
| 396601 ||  || — || August 19, 2001 || Socorro || LINEAR || — || align=right | 2.3 km || 
|-id=602 bgcolor=#fefefe
| 396602 ||  || — || August 22, 2001 || Haleakala || NEAT || — || align=right data-sort-value="0.77" | 770 m || 
|-id=603 bgcolor=#E9E9E9
| 396603 ||  || — || August 22, 2001 || Socorro || LINEAR || JUN || align=right | 1.3 km || 
|-id=604 bgcolor=#E9E9E9
| 396604 ||  || — || August 24, 2001 || Anderson Mesa || LONEOS || — || align=right | 2.3 km || 
|-id=605 bgcolor=#FA8072
| 396605 ||  || — || September 12, 2001 || Socorro || LINEAR || — || align=right | 2.1 km || 
|-id=606 bgcolor=#E9E9E9
| 396606 ||  || — || September 8, 2001 || Socorro || LINEAR || — || align=right | 2.1 km || 
|-id=607 bgcolor=#E9E9E9
| 396607 ||  || — || September 9, 2001 || Anderson Mesa || LONEOS || — || align=right | 2.9 km || 
|-id=608 bgcolor=#E9E9E9
| 396608 ||  || — || September 11, 2001 || Anderson Mesa || LONEOS || — || align=right | 2.1 km || 
|-id=609 bgcolor=#E9E9E9
| 396609 ||  || — || September 16, 2001 || Socorro || LINEAR || — || align=right | 2.0 km || 
|-id=610 bgcolor=#fefefe
| 396610 ||  || — || September 16, 2001 || Socorro || LINEAR || — || align=right data-sort-value="0.66" | 660 m || 
|-id=611 bgcolor=#fefefe
| 396611 ||  || — || September 20, 2001 || Socorro || LINEAR || V || align=right data-sort-value="0.74" | 740 m || 
|-id=612 bgcolor=#E9E9E9
| 396612 ||  || — || September 19, 2001 || Kitt Peak || Spacewatch || — || align=right | 2.6 km || 
|-id=613 bgcolor=#E9E9E9
| 396613 ||  || — || September 20, 2001 || Socorro || LINEAR || — || align=right | 2.0 km || 
|-id=614 bgcolor=#FA8072
| 396614 ||  || — || September 21, 2001 || Socorro || LINEAR || — || align=right data-sort-value="0.61" | 610 m || 
|-id=615 bgcolor=#fefefe
| 396615 ||  || — || September 16, 2001 || Socorro || LINEAR || — || align=right data-sort-value="0.66" | 660 m || 
|-id=616 bgcolor=#fefefe
| 396616 ||  || — || September 16, 2001 || Socorro || LINEAR || — || align=right data-sort-value="0.59" | 590 m || 
|-id=617 bgcolor=#E9E9E9
| 396617 ||  || — || September 19, 2001 || Socorro || LINEAR || EUN || align=right | 1.3 km || 
|-id=618 bgcolor=#FA8072
| 396618 ||  || — || September 17, 2001 || Anderson Mesa || LONEOS || — || align=right data-sort-value="0.67" | 670 m || 
|-id=619 bgcolor=#fefefe
| 396619 ||  || — || October 14, 2001 || Socorro || LINEAR || — || align=right data-sort-value="0.91" | 910 m || 
|-id=620 bgcolor=#E9E9E9
| 396620 ||  || — || October 14, 2001 || Socorro || LINEAR || — || align=right | 1.7 km || 
|-id=621 bgcolor=#fefefe
| 396621 ||  || — || October 14, 2001 || Socorro || LINEAR || — || align=right | 1.0 km || 
|-id=622 bgcolor=#fefefe
| 396622 ||  || — || October 14, 2001 || Socorro || LINEAR || — || align=right data-sort-value="0.97" | 970 m || 
|-id=623 bgcolor=#E9E9E9
| 396623 ||  || — || September 19, 2001 || Anderson Mesa || LONEOS || — || align=right | 2.3 km || 
|-id=624 bgcolor=#fefefe
| 396624 ||  || — || October 15, 2001 || Haleakala || NEAT || — || align=right data-sort-value="0.85" | 850 m || 
|-id=625 bgcolor=#fefefe
| 396625 ||  || — || September 25, 2001 || Socorro || LINEAR || — || align=right | 1.0 km || 
|-id=626 bgcolor=#FA8072
| 396626 ||  || — || September 12, 2001 || Socorro || LINEAR || — || align=right data-sort-value="0.59" | 590 m || 
|-id=627 bgcolor=#fefefe
| 396627 ||  || — || October 23, 2001 || Socorro || LINEAR || H || align=right data-sort-value="0.99" | 990 m || 
|-id=628 bgcolor=#fefefe
| 396628 ||  || — || October 17, 2001 || Socorro || LINEAR || — || align=right data-sort-value="0.56" | 560 m || 
|-id=629 bgcolor=#E9E9E9
| 396629 ||  || — || October 22, 2001 || Socorro || LINEAR || — || align=right | 2.5 km || 
|-id=630 bgcolor=#fefefe
| 396630 ||  || — || October 22, 2001 || Socorro || LINEAR || — || align=right data-sort-value="0.74" | 740 m || 
|-id=631 bgcolor=#fefefe
| 396631 ||  || — || October 18, 2001 || Kitt Peak || Spacewatch || — || align=right data-sort-value="0.77" | 770 m || 
|-id=632 bgcolor=#fefefe
| 396632 ||  || — || October 21, 2001 || Socorro || LINEAR || V || align=right data-sort-value="0.63" | 630 m || 
|-id=633 bgcolor=#d6d6d6
| 396633 ||  || — || October 23, 2001 || Kitt Peak || Spacewatch || — || align=right | 2.6 km || 
|-id=634 bgcolor=#fefefe
| 396634 ||  || — || November 10, 2001 || Socorro || LINEAR || — || align=right data-sort-value="0.98" | 980 m || 
|-id=635 bgcolor=#fefefe
| 396635 ||  || — || November 9, 2001 || Socorro || LINEAR || — || align=right data-sort-value="0.72" | 720 m || 
|-id=636 bgcolor=#fefefe
| 396636 ||  || — || November 12, 2001 || Socorro || LINEAR || H || align=right data-sort-value="0.89" | 890 m || 
|-id=637 bgcolor=#d6d6d6
| 396637 ||  || — || November 12, 2001 || Socorro || LINEAR || — || align=right | 3.3 km || 
|-id=638 bgcolor=#FA8072
| 396638 ||  || — || November 17, 2001 || Socorro || LINEAR || — || align=right | 1.0 km || 
|-id=639 bgcolor=#d6d6d6
| 396639 ||  || — || November 18, 2001 || Socorro || LINEAR || EOS || align=right | 1.7 km || 
|-id=640 bgcolor=#d6d6d6
| 396640 ||  || — || November 20, 2001 || Socorro || LINEAR || — || align=right | 3.1 km || 
|-id=641 bgcolor=#fefefe
| 396641 ||  || — || November 19, 2001 || Socorro || LINEAR || — || align=right data-sort-value="0.79" | 790 m || 
|-id=642 bgcolor=#fefefe
| 396642 ||  || — || December 11, 2001 || Socorro || LINEAR || H || align=right data-sort-value="0.73" | 730 m || 
|-id=643 bgcolor=#d6d6d6
| 396643 ||  || — || December 14, 2001 || Kitt Peak || Spacewatch || — || align=right | 2.9 km || 
|-id=644 bgcolor=#fefefe
| 396644 ||  || — || December 15, 2001 || Socorro || LINEAR || NYS || align=right data-sort-value="0.76" | 760 m || 
|-id=645 bgcolor=#fefefe
| 396645 ||  || — || December 9, 2001 || Socorro || LINEAR || H || align=right data-sort-value="0.83" | 830 m || 
|-id=646 bgcolor=#fefefe
| 396646 ||  || — || January 12, 2002 || Socorro || LINEAR || H || align=right | 1.1 km || 
|-id=647 bgcolor=#d6d6d6
| 396647 ||  || — || January 21, 2002 || Socorro || LINEAR || — || align=right | 3.5 km || 
|-id=648 bgcolor=#fefefe
| 396648 ||  || — || February 6, 2002 || Socorro || LINEAR || — || align=right data-sort-value="0.81" | 810 m || 
|-id=649 bgcolor=#d6d6d6
| 396649 ||  || — || January 22, 2002 || Kitt Peak || Spacewatch || — || align=right | 3.5 km || 
|-id=650 bgcolor=#C2FFFF
| 396650 ||  || — || February 13, 2002 || Kitt Peak || Spacewatch || L4 || align=right | 11 km || 
|-id=651 bgcolor=#fefefe
| 396651 ||  || — || March 14, 2002 || Socorro || LINEAR || — || align=right | 1.2 km || 
|-id=652 bgcolor=#d6d6d6
| 396652 ||  || — || April 5, 2002 || Palomar || NEAT || — || align=right | 2.6 km || 
|-id=653 bgcolor=#fefefe
| 396653 ||  || — || April 21, 2002 || Palomar || NEAT || — || align=right | 1.5 km || 
|-id=654 bgcolor=#d6d6d6
| 396654 ||  || — || May 9, 2002 || Kitt Peak || Spacewatch || — || align=right | 3.8 km || 
|-id=655 bgcolor=#d6d6d6
| 396655 ||  || — || April 21, 2002 || Socorro || LINEAR || EUP || align=right | 4.1 km || 
|-id=656 bgcolor=#FA8072
| 396656 ||  || — || June 21, 2002 || La Palma || La Palma Obs. || — || align=right | 1.4 km || 
|-id=657 bgcolor=#E9E9E9
| 396657 ||  || — || July 11, 2002 || Socorro || LINEAR || — || align=right | 3.5 km || 
|-id=658 bgcolor=#E9E9E9
| 396658 ||  || — || July 9, 2002 || Socorro || LINEAR || — || align=right | 1.8 km || 
|-id=659 bgcolor=#E9E9E9
| 396659 ||  || — || July 8, 2002 || Palomar || NEAT || BRG || align=right | 1.4 km || 
|-id=660 bgcolor=#E9E9E9
| 396660 ||  || — || July 8, 2002 || Palomar || NEAT || — || align=right data-sort-value="0.87" | 870 m || 
|-id=661 bgcolor=#FA8072
| 396661 ||  || — || July 21, 2002 || Palomar || NEAT || — || align=right data-sort-value="0.43" | 430 m || 
|-id=662 bgcolor=#E9E9E9
| 396662 ||  || — || July 22, 2002 || Palomar || NEAT || — || align=right data-sort-value="0.96" | 960 m || 
|-id=663 bgcolor=#fefefe
| 396663 ||  || — || August 6, 2002 || Palomar || NEAT || — || align=right data-sort-value="0.66" | 660 m || 
|-id=664 bgcolor=#E9E9E9
| 396664 ||  || — || August 6, 2002 || Palomar || NEAT || (5) || align=right data-sort-value="0.78" | 780 m || 
|-id=665 bgcolor=#E9E9E9
| 396665 ||  || — || August 14, 2002 || Palomar || NEAT || JUN || align=right | 1.0 km || 
|-id=666 bgcolor=#E9E9E9
| 396666 ||  || — || August 14, 2002 || Anderson Mesa || LONEOS || (1547) || align=right | 2.0 km || 
|-id=667 bgcolor=#E9E9E9
| 396667 ||  || — || August 13, 2002 || Anderson Mesa || LONEOS || — || align=right | 1.0 km || 
|-id=668 bgcolor=#E9E9E9
| 396668 ||  || — || August 8, 2002 || Palomar || S. F. Hönig || (5) || align=right data-sort-value="0.82" | 820 m || 
|-id=669 bgcolor=#E9E9E9
| 396669 ||  || — || August 29, 2002 || Palomar || NEAT || (5) || align=right data-sort-value="0.96" | 960 m || 
|-id=670 bgcolor=#fefefe
| 396670 ||  || — || August 28, 2002 || Palomar || NEAT || — || align=right data-sort-value="0.55" | 550 m || 
|-id=671 bgcolor=#E9E9E9
| 396671 ||  || — || September 3, 2002 || Palomar || NEAT || — || align=right | 1.8 km || 
|-id=672 bgcolor=#E9E9E9
| 396672 ||  || — || September 5, 2002 || Socorro || LINEAR || — || align=right | 1.1 km || 
|-id=673 bgcolor=#E9E9E9
| 396673 ||  || — || September 5, 2002 || Socorro || LINEAR || — || align=right | 1.5 km || 
|-id=674 bgcolor=#E9E9E9
| 396674 ||  || — || September 5, 2002 || Socorro || LINEAR || JUN || align=right | 1.4 km || 
|-id=675 bgcolor=#FA8072
| 396675 ||  || — || September 13, 2002 || Palomar || NEAT || — || align=right data-sort-value="0.53" | 530 m || 
|-id=676 bgcolor=#d6d6d6
| 396676 ||  || — || August 16, 2002 || Socorro || LINEAR || TIR || align=right | 3.5 km || 
|-id=677 bgcolor=#E9E9E9
| 396677 ||  || — || September 12, 2002 || Palomar || NEAT || EUN || align=right | 1.6 km || 
|-id=678 bgcolor=#fefefe
| 396678 ||  || — || September 12, 2002 || Palomar || NEAT || — || align=right data-sort-value="0.58" | 580 m || 
|-id=679 bgcolor=#E9E9E9
| 396679 ||  || — || September 14, 2002 || Haleakala || NEAT || — || align=right | 1.1 km || 
|-id=680 bgcolor=#FA8072
| 396680 ||  || — || September 23, 2002 || Palomar || NEAT || — || align=right | 1.4 km || 
|-id=681 bgcolor=#E9E9E9
| 396681 ||  || — || September 27, 2002 || Palomar || NEAT || — || align=right data-sort-value="0.82" | 820 m || 
|-id=682 bgcolor=#E9E9E9
| 396682 ||  || — || August 12, 2002 || Socorro || LINEAR || — || align=right | 1.6 km || 
|-id=683 bgcolor=#E9E9E9
| 396683 ||  || — || October 1, 2002 || Anderson Mesa || LONEOS || — || align=right | 1.5 km || 
|-id=684 bgcolor=#fefefe
| 396684 ||  || — || October 1, 2002 || Anderson Mesa || LONEOS || — || align=right data-sort-value="0.65" | 650 m || 
|-id=685 bgcolor=#E9E9E9
| 396685 ||  || — || October 1, 2002 || Haleakala || NEAT || — || align=right | 1.4 km || 
|-id=686 bgcolor=#FA8072
| 396686 ||  || — || October 2, 2002 || Socorro || LINEAR || — || align=right | 1.4 km || 
|-id=687 bgcolor=#E9E9E9
| 396687 ||  || — || October 3, 2002 || Campo Imperatore || CINEOS || EUN || align=right | 1.4 km || 
|-id=688 bgcolor=#E9E9E9
| 396688 ||  || — || October 1, 2002 || Socorro || LINEAR || — || align=right | 1.5 km || 
|-id=689 bgcolor=#fefefe
| 396689 ||  || — || October 3, 2002 || Socorro || LINEAR || — || align=right data-sort-value="0.68" | 680 m || 
|-id=690 bgcolor=#fefefe
| 396690 ||  || — || October 4, 2002 || Kitt Peak || Spacewatch || — || align=right data-sort-value="0.66" | 660 m || 
|-id=691 bgcolor=#E9E9E9
| 396691 ||  || — || October 4, 2002 || Palomar || NEAT || EUN || align=right | 1.4 km || 
|-id=692 bgcolor=#E9E9E9
| 396692 ||  || — || October 3, 2002 || Socorro || LINEAR || — || align=right | 1.4 km || 
|-id=693 bgcolor=#fefefe
| 396693 ||  || — || October 4, 2002 || Socorro || LINEAR || — || align=right data-sort-value="0.67" | 670 m || 
|-id=694 bgcolor=#E9E9E9
| 396694 ||  || — || October 5, 2002 || Palomar || NEAT || (5) || align=right data-sort-value="0.87" | 870 m || 
|-id=695 bgcolor=#E9E9E9
| 396695 ||  || — || October 4, 2002 || Anderson Mesa || LONEOS || EUN || align=right | 1.6 km || 
|-id=696 bgcolor=#E9E9E9
| 396696 ||  || — || October 6, 2002 || Socorro || LINEAR || EUN || align=right | 1.7 km || 
|-id=697 bgcolor=#E9E9E9
| 396697 ||  || — || October 6, 2002 || Socorro || LINEAR || EUN || align=right | 1.7 km || 
|-id=698 bgcolor=#E9E9E9
| 396698 ||  || — || October 3, 2002 || Socorro || LINEAR || — || align=right | 1.8 km || 
|-id=699 bgcolor=#E9E9E9
| 396699 ||  || — || October 2, 2002 || Socorro || LINEAR || — || align=right | 2.4 km || 
|-id=700 bgcolor=#E9E9E9
| 396700 ||  || — || October 9, 2002 || Socorro || LINEAR || — || align=right | 1.8 km || 
|}

396701–396800 

|-bgcolor=#d6d6d6
| 396701 ||  || — || October 11, 2002 || Kitt Peak || Spacewatch || 7:4 || align=right | 3.3 km || 
|-id=702 bgcolor=#E9E9E9
| 396702 ||  || — || October 10, 2002 || Apache Point || SDSS || (5) || align=right data-sort-value="0.64" | 640 m || 
|-id=703 bgcolor=#E9E9E9
| 396703 ||  || — || October 10, 2002 || Apache Point || SDSS || — || align=right | 1.7 km || 
|-id=704 bgcolor=#E9E9E9
| 396704 ||  || — || October 10, 2002 || Apache Point || SDSS || — || align=right | 1.3 km || 
|-id=705 bgcolor=#E9E9E9
| 396705 ||  || — || October 9, 2002 || Palomar || NEAT || — || align=right | 1.7 km || 
|-id=706 bgcolor=#E9E9E9
| 396706 ||  || — || October 30, 2002 || Socorro || LINEAR || — || align=right | 3.3 km || 
|-id=707 bgcolor=#FA8072
| 396707 ||  || — || October 30, 2002 || Kitt Peak || Spacewatch || — || align=right data-sort-value="0.30" | 300 m || 
|-id=708 bgcolor=#FA8072
| 396708 ||  || — || October 30, 2002 || Palomar || NEAT || — || align=right data-sort-value="0.55" | 550 m || 
|-id=709 bgcolor=#E9E9E9
| 396709 ||  || — || November 7, 2002 || Kingsnake || J. V. McClusky || — || align=right | 2.3 km || 
|-id=710 bgcolor=#E9E9E9
| 396710 ||  || — || November 6, 2002 || Anderson Mesa || LONEOS || — || align=right | 2.3 km || 
|-id=711 bgcolor=#E9E9E9
| 396711 ||  || — || November 7, 2002 || Socorro || LINEAR || (194) || align=right | 1.8 km || 
|-id=712 bgcolor=#E9E9E9
| 396712 ||  || — || November 8, 2002 || Socorro || LINEAR || — || align=right | 3.3 km || 
|-id=713 bgcolor=#fefefe
| 396713 ||  || — || November 12, 2002 || Socorro || LINEAR || H || align=right data-sort-value="0.85" | 850 m || 
|-id=714 bgcolor=#fefefe
| 396714 ||  || — || November 11, 2002 || Socorro || LINEAR || — || align=right | 1.1 km || 
|-id=715 bgcolor=#E9E9E9
| 396715 ||  || — || November 13, 2002 || Palomar || NEAT || critical || align=right | 2.6 km || 
|-id=716 bgcolor=#E9E9E9
| 396716 ||  || — || November 15, 2002 || Palomar || NEAT || — || align=right | 2.3 km || 
|-id=717 bgcolor=#fefefe
| 396717 ||  || — || November 3, 2002 || Palomar || NEAT || — || align=right data-sort-value="0.72" | 720 m || 
|-id=718 bgcolor=#E9E9E9
| 396718 ||  || — || November 4, 2002 || Palomar || NEAT || — || align=right | 1.1 km || 
|-id=719 bgcolor=#d6d6d6
| 396719 ||  || — || November 23, 2002 || Palomar || NEAT || — || align=right | 3.5 km || 
|-id=720 bgcolor=#E9E9E9
| 396720 ||  || — || November 24, 2002 || Palomar || NEAT || — || align=right | 1.5 km || 
|-id=721 bgcolor=#fefefe
| 396721 ||  || — || December 10, 2002 || Socorro || LINEAR || — || align=right data-sort-value="0.90" | 900 m || 
|-id=722 bgcolor=#E9E9E9
| 396722 ||  || — || December 10, 2002 || Palomar || NEAT || — || align=right | 2.2 km || 
|-id=723 bgcolor=#FA8072
| 396723 ||  || — || January 7, 2003 || Socorro || LINEAR || — || align=right data-sort-value="0.56" | 560 m || 
|-id=724 bgcolor=#d6d6d6
| 396724 ||  || — || February 28, 2003 || Socorro || LINEAR || — || align=right | 3.1 km || 
|-id=725 bgcolor=#fefefe
| 396725 ||  || — || March 6, 2003 || Palomar || NEAT || — || align=right | 1.1 km || 
|-id=726 bgcolor=#fefefe
| 396726 ||  || — || March 25, 2003 || Kitt Peak || Spacewatch || — || align=right | 1.0 km || 
|-id=727 bgcolor=#fefefe
| 396727 ||  || — || March 24, 2003 || Kitt Peak || Spacewatch || NYS || align=right data-sort-value="0.63" | 630 m || 
|-id=728 bgcolor=#fefefe
| 396728 ||  || — || April 25, 2003 || Kitt Peak || Spacewatch || — || align=right data-sort-value="0.68" | 680 m || 
|-id=729 bgcolor=#d6d6d6
| 396729 ||  || — || May 22, 2003 || Kitt Peak || Spacewatch || — || align=right | 3.7 km || 
|-id=730 bgcolor=#FFC2E0
| 396730 ||  || — || May 29, 2003 || Haleakala || NEAT || APO || align=right data-sort-value="0.73" | 730 m || 
|-id=731 bgcolor=#d6d6d6
| 396731 ||  || — || June 29, 2003 || Socorro || LINEAR || — || align=right | 5.6 km || 
|-id=732 bgcolor=#d6d6d6
| 396732 ||  || — || July 23, 2003 || Palomar || NEAT || — || align=right | 3.9 km || 
|-id=733 bgcolor=#fefefe
| 396733 ||  || — || August 3, 2003 || Needville || Needville Obs. || — || align=right data-sort-value="0.82" | 820 m || 
|-id=734 bgcolor=#fefefe
| 396734 ||  || — || August 4, 2003 || Kitt Peak || Spacewatch || (5026) || align=right data-sort-value="0.90" | 900 m || 
|-id=735 bgcolor=#fefefe
| 396735 ||  || — || August 20, 2003 || Campo Imperatore || CINEOS || — || align=right | 1.0 km || 
|-id=736 bgcolor=#E9E9E9
| 396736 ||  || — || August 23, 2003 || Palomar || NEAT || — || align=right | 2.5 km || 
|-id=737 bgcolor=#fefefe
| 396737 ||  || — || August 28, 2003 || Haleakala || NEAT || — || align=right data-sort-value="0.72" | 720 m || 
|-id=738 bgcolor=#d6d6d6
| 396738 ||  || — || August 21, 2003 || Socorro || LINEAR || — || align=right | 5.4 km || 
|-id=739 bgcolor=#d6d6d6
| 396739 ||  || — || September 15, 2003 || Anderson Mesa || LONEOS || 7:4 || align=right | 2.9 km || 
|-id=740 bgcolor=#fefefe
| 396740 ||  || — || September 17, 2003 || Kitt Peak || Spacewatch || — || align=right | 1.3 km || 
|-id=741 bgcolor=#fefefe
| 396741 ||  || — || September 17, 2003 || Kitt Peak || Spacewatch || NYS || align=right data-sort-value="0.87" | 870 m || 
|-id=742 bgcolor=#E9E9E9
| 396742 ||  || — || September 17, 2003 || Palomar || NEAT || — || align=right | 1.3 km || 
|-id=743 bgcolor=#fefefe
| 396743 ||  || — || September 16, 2003 || Palomar || NEAT || H || align=right data-sort-value="0.73" | 730 m || 
|-id=744 bgcolor=#d6d6d6
| 396744 ||  || — || September 17, 2003 || Socorro || LINEAR || — || align=right | 4.9 km || 
|-id=745 bgcolor=#d6d6d6
| 396745 ||  || — || September 19, 2003 || Palomar || NEAT || — || align=right | 3.3 km || 
|-id=746 bgcolor=#fefefe
| 396746 ||  || — || September 19, 2003 || Palomar || NEAT || — || align=right | 1.2 km || 
|-id=747 bgcolor=#E9E9E9
| 396747 ||  || — || September 28, 2003 || Desert Eagle || W. K. Y. Yeung || — || align=right | 1.7 km || 
|-id=748 bgcolor=#d6d6d6
| 396748 ||  || — || September 19, 2003 || Kitt Peak || Spacewatch || — || align=right | 3.7 km || 
|-id=749 bgcolor=#fefefe
| 396749 ||  || — || September 17, 2003 || Palomar || NEAT || — || align=right data-sort-value="0.68" | 680 m || 
|-id=750 bgcolor=#d6d6d6
| 396750 ||  || — || September 19, 2003 || Palomar || NEAT || — || align=right | 4.0 km || 
|-id=751 bgcolor=#E9E9E9
| 396751 ||  || — || September 26, 2003 || Apache Point || SDSS || HNS || align=right data-sort-value="0.94" | 940 m || 
|-id=752 bgcolor=#E9E9E9
| 396752 ||  || — || October 1, 2003 || Kitt Peak || Spacewatch || KON || align=right | 2.9 km || 
|-id=753 bgcolor=#E9E9E9
| 396753 ||  || — || October 16, 2003 || Kitt Peak || Spacewatch || MAR || align=right data-sort-value="0.95" | 950 m || 
|-id=754 bgcolor=#d6d6d6
| 396754 ||  || — || October 18, 2003 || Palomar || NEAT || THB || align=right | 5.7 km || 
|-id=755 bgcolor=#fefefe
| 396755 ||  || — || October 19, 2003 || Goodricke-Pigott || R. A. Tucker || — || align=right data-sort-value="0.85" | 850 m || 
|-id=756 bgcolor=#E9E9E9
| 396756 ||  || — || October 16, 2003 || Palomar || NEAT || — || align=right | 1.2 km || 
|-id=757 bgcolor=#fefefe
| 396757 ||  || — || October 20, 2003 || Palomar || NEAT || — || align=right data-sort-value="0.90" | 900 m || 
|-id=758 bgcolor=#E9E9E9
| 396758 ||  || — || October 24, 2003 || Socorro || LINEAR || DOR || align=right | 2.7 km || 
|-id=759 bgcolor=#fefefe
| 396759 ||  || — || October 25, 2003 || Socorro || LINEAR || — || align=right | 1.0 km || 
|-id=760 bgcolor=#E9E9E9
| 396760 ||  || — || October 17, 2003 || Kitt Peak || Spacewatch || — || align=right | 1.1 km || 
|-id=761 bgcolor=#d6d6d6
| 396761 ||  || — || October 19, 2003 || Apache Point || SDSS || — || align=right | 3.0 km || 
|-id=762 bgcolor=#E9E9E9
| 396762 ||  || — || October 19, 2003 || Apache Point || SDSS || (5) || align=right data-sort-value="0.76" | 760 m || 
|-id=763 bgcolor=#E9E9E9
| 396763 ||  || — || October 22, 2003 || Apache Point || SDSS || HNS || align=right data-sort-value="0.90" | 900 m || 
|-id=764 bgcolor=#E9E9E9
| 396764 ||  || — || October 22, 2003 || Apache Point || SDSS || MAR || align=right | 1.0 km || 
|-id=765 bgcolor=#fefefe
| 396765 ||  || — || October 29, 2003 || Socorro || LINEAR || — || align=right data-sort-value="0.93" | 930 m || 
|-id=766 bgcolor=#E9E9E9
| 396766 ||  || — || November 19, 2003 || Kitt Peak || Spacewatch || (5) || align=right data-sort-value="0.91" | 910 m || 
|-id=767 bgcolor=#E9E9E9
| 396767 ||  || — || November 19, 2003 || Anderson Mesa || LONEOS || — || align=right | 1.7 km || 
|-id=768 bgcolor=#E9E9E9
| 396768 ||  || — || November 21, 2003 || Socorro || LINEAR || — || align=right | 1.1 km || 
|-id=769 bgcolor=#E9E9E9
| 396769 ||  || — || November 21, 2003 || Socorro || LINEAR || — || align=right | 1.7 km || 
|-id=770 bgcolor=#E9E9E9
| 396770 ||  || — || November 21, 2003 || Socorro || LINEAR || — || align=right | 2.1 km || 
|-id=771 bgcolor=#fefefe
| 396771 ||  || — || November 24, 2003 || Socorro || LINEAR || — || align=right | 1.3 km || 
|-id=772 bgcolor=#E9E9E9
| 396772 ||  || — || October 29, 2003 || Anderson Mesa || LONEOS || — || align=right | 3.1 km || 
|-id=773 bgcolor=#E9E9E9
| 396773 ||  || — || December 17, 2003 || Kitt Peak || Spacewatch || — || align=right | 2.0 km || 
|-id=774 bgcolor=#E9E9E9
| 396774 ||  || — || November 18, 2003 || Kitt Peak || Spacewatch || — || align=right | 2.3 km || 
|-id=775 bgcolor=#E9E9E9
| 396775 ||  || — || December 27, 2003 || Socorro || LINEAR || JUN || align=right | 1.5 km || 
|-id=776 bgcolor=#E9E9E9
| 396776 ||  || — || December 29, 2003 || Socorro || LINEAR || EUN || align=right | 1.8 km || 
|-id=777 bgcolor=#E9E9E9
| 396777 ||  || — || January 22, 2004 || Palomar || NEAT ||  || align=right | 2.9 km || 
|-id=778 bgcolor=#E9E9E9
| 396778 ||  || — || January 27, 2004 || Kitt Peak || Spacewatch || EUN || align=right | 1.6 km || 
|-id=779 bgcolor=#E9E9E9
| 396779 ||  || — || February 11, 2004 || Kitt Peak || Spacewatch || — || align=right | 1.7 km || 
|-id=780 bgcolor=#E9E9E9
| 396780 ||  || — || February 12, 2004 || Kitt Peak || Spacewatch || — || align=right | 2.3 km || 
|-id=781 bgcolor=#E9E9E9
| 396781 ||  || — || January 24, 2004 || Socorro || LINEAR || — || align=right | 2.3 km || 
|-id=782 bgcolor=#E9E9E9
| 396782 ||  || — || February 26, 2004 || Socorro || LINEAR || — || align=right | 1.3 km || 
|-id=783 bgcolor=#E9E9E9
| 396783 ||  || — || March 15, 2004 || Kitt Peak || Spacewatch || — || align=right | 1.9 km || 
|-id=784 bgcolor=#fefefe
| 396784 ||  || — || March 15, 2004 || Kitt Peak || Spacewatch || — || align=right data-sort-value="0.91" | 910 m || 
|-id=785 bgcolor=#fefefe
| 396785 ||  || — || March 19, 2004 || Kitt Peak || Spacewatch || — || align=right data-sort-value="0.80" | 800 m || 
|-id=786 bgcolor=#fefefe
| 396786 ||  || — || March 17, 2004 || Kitt Peak || Spacewatch || — || align=right data-sort-value="0.71" | 710 m || 
|-id=787 bgcolor=#d6d6d6
| 396787 ||  || — || March 27, 2004 || Catalina || CSS || — || align=right | 2.3 km || 
|-id=788 bgcolor=#fefefe
| 396788 ||  || — || April 9, 2004 || Siding Spring || SSS || — || align=right | 2.8 km || 
|-id=789 bgcolor=#fefefe
| 396789 ||  || — || April 14, 2004 || Kitt Peak || Spacewatch || — || align=right data-sort-value="0.74" | 740 m || 
|-id=790 bgcolor=#fefefe
| 396790 ||  || — || April 16, 2004 || Socorro || LINEAR || — || align=right data-sort-value="0.73" | 730 m || 
|-id=791 bgcolor=#d6d6d6
| 396791 ||  || — || April 21, 2004 || Socorro || LINEAR || — || align=right | 2.7 km || 
|-id=792 bgcolor=#fefefe
| 396792 ||  || — || April 25, 2004 || Socorro || LINEAR || — || align=right data-sort-value="0.86" | 860 m || 
|-id=793 bgcolor=#FFC2E0
| 396793 ||  || — || May 9, 2004 || Kitt Peak || Spacewatch || APOcritical || align=right data-sort-value="0.34" | 340 m || 
|-id=794 bgcolor=#FFC2E0
| 396794 ||  || — || May 16, 2004 || Siding Spring || SSS || APO +1km || align=right | 1.00 km || 
|-id=795 bgcolor=#FA8072
| 396795 ||  || — || July 14, 2004 || Socorro || LINEAR || — || align=right | 1.4 km || 
|-id=796 bgcolor=#fefefe
| 396796 ||  || — || July 16, 2004 || Socorro || LINEAR || — || align=right data-sort-value="0.76" | 760 m || 
|-id=797 bgcolor=#fefefe
| 396797 ||  || — || July 16, 2004 || Socorro || LINEAR || (2076) || align=right data-sort-value="0.82" | 820 m || 
|-id=798 bgcolor=#fefefe
| 396798 ||  || — || July 19, 2004 || Anderson Mesa || LONEOS || — || align=right data-sort-value="0.79" | 790 m || 
|-id=799 bgcolor=#fefefe
| 396799 ||  || — || June 12, 2004 || Siding Spring || SSS || — || align=right | 1.0 km || 
|-id=800 bgcolor=#fefefe
| 396800 ||  || — || July 14, 2004 || Socorro || LINEAR || — || align=right data-sort-value="0.91" | 910 m || 
|}

396801–396900 

|-bgcolor=#fefefe
| 396801 ||  || — || August 6, 2004 || Palomar || NEAT || — || align=right data-sort-value="0.95" | 950 m || 
|-id=802 bgcolor=#fefefe
| 396802 ||  || — || August 7, 2004 || Palomar || NEAT || — || align=right data-sort-value="0.64" | 640 m || 
|-id=803 bgcolor=#fefefe
| 396803 ||  || — || August 8, 2004 || Campo Imperatore || CINEOS || — || align=right data-sort-value="0.98" | 980 m || 
|-id=804 bgcolor=#fefefe
| 396804 ||  || — || August 8, 2004 || Socorro || LINEAR || — || align=right data-sort-value="0.82" | 820 m || 
|-id=805 bgcolor=#fefefe
| 396805 ||  || — || August 8, 2004 || Anderson Mesa || LONEOS || — || align=right data-sort-value="0.74" | 740 m || 
|-id=806 bgcolor=#d6d6d6
| 396806 ||  || — || August 10, 2004 || Socorro || LINEAR || — || align=right | 3.6 km || 
|-id=807 bgcolor=#fefefe
| 396807 ||  || — || August 7, 2004 || Palomar || NEAT || — || align=right | 1.2 km || 
|-id=808 bgcolor=#d6d6d6
| 396808 ||  || — || August 11, 2004 || Socorro || LINEAR || — || align=right | 2.7 km || 
|-id=809 bgcolor=#fefefe
| 396809 ||  || — || August 10, 2004 || Socorro || LINEAR || — || align=right data-sort-value="0.89" | 890 m || 
|-id=810 bgcolor=#FA8072
| 396810 ||  || — || August 12, 2004 || Socorro || LINEAR || — || align=right | 1.2 km || 
|-id=811 bgcolor=#fefefe
| 396811 ||  || — || August 12, 2004 || Socorro || LINEAR || — || align=right data-sort-value="0.77" | 770 m || 
|-id=812 bgcolor=#d6d6d6
| 396812 ||  || — || August 12, 2004 || Socorro || LINEAR || — || align=right | 3.0 km || 
|-id=813 bgcolor=#d6d6d6
| 396813 ||  || — || August 8, 2004 || Anderson Mesa || LONEOS || — || align=right | 5.4 km || 
|-id=814 bgcolor=#fefefe
| 396814 ||  || — || August 21, 2004 || Siding Spring || SSS || — || align=right | 1.0 km || 
|-id=815 bgcolor=#FA8072
| 396815 ||  || — || August 27, 2004 || Socorro || LINEAR || — || align=right | 1.7 km || 
|-id=816 bgcolor=#C2FFFF
| 396816 ||  || — || August 17, 2004 || Mauna Kea || D. J. Tholen || L4 || align=right | 8.3 km || 
|-id=817 bgcolor=#fefefe
| 396817 ||  || — || September 6, 2004 || Socorro || LINEAR || — || align=right | 1.7 km || 
|-id=818 bgcolor=#FA8072
| 396818 ||  || — || September 6, 2004 || Socorro || LINEAR || H || align=right data-sort-value="0.73" | 730 m || 
|-id=819 bgcolor=#d6d6d6
| 396819 ||  || — || September 8, 2004 || Socorro || LINEAR || — || align=right | 2.4 km || 
|-id=820 bgcolor=#d6d6d6
| 396820 ||  || — || September 8, 2004 || Socorro || LINEAR || — || align=right | 2.5 km || 
|-id=821 bgcolor=#fefefe
| 396821 ||  || — || September 8, 2004 || Socorro || LINEAR || V || align=right data-sort-value="0.74" | 740 m || 
|-id=822 bgcolor=#fefefe
| 396822 ||  || — || August 27, 2004 || Anderson Mesa || LONEOS || — || align=right | 2.1 km || 
|-id=823 bgcolor=#d6d6d6
| 396823 ||  || — || September 8, 2004 || Socorro || LINEAR || — || align=right | 3.1 km || 
|-id=824 bgcolor=#d6d6d6
| 396824 ||  || — || September 7, 2004 || Kitt Peak || Spacewatch || THM || align=right | 2.2 km || 
|-id=825 bgcolor=#d6d6d6
| 396825 ||  || — || August 21, 2004 || Catalina || CSS || — || align=right | 3.1 km || 
|-id=826 bgcolor=#fefefe
| 396826 ||  || — || September 8, 2004 || Socorro || LINEAR || — || align=right data-sort-value="0.76" | 760 m || 
|-id=827 bgcolor=#d6d6d6
| 396827 ||  || — || September 4, 2004 || Palomar || NEAT || — || align=right | 4.4 km || 
|-id=828 bgcolor=#d6d6d6
| 396828 ||  || — || September 7, 2004 || Kitt Peak || Spacewatch || — || align=right | 2.3 km || 
|-id=829 bgcolor=#d6d6d6
| 396829 ||  || — || September 8, 2004 || Socorro || LINEAR || — || align=right | 2.7 km || 
|-id=830 bgcolor=#d6d6d6
| 396830 ||  || — || September 9, 2004 || Socorro || LINEAR || — || align=right | 2.5 km || 
|-id=831 bgcolor=#fefefe
| 396831 ||  || — || September 10, 2004 || Socorro || LINEAR || — || align=right data-sort-value="0.90" | 900 m || 
|-id=832 bgcolor=#d6d6d6
| 396832 ||  || — || August 22, 2004 || Kitt Peak || Spacewatch || — || align=right | 3.1 km || 
|-id=833 bgcolor=#fefefe
| 396833 ||  || — || September 10, 2004 || Socorro || LINEAR || NYS || align=right data-sort-value="0.66" | 660 m || 
|-id=834 bgcolor=#fefefe
| 396834 ||  || — || September 10, 2004 || Socorro || LINEAR || — || align=right data-sort-value="0.86" | 860 m || 
|-id=835 bgcolor=#d6d6d6
| 396835 ||  || — || September 11, 2004 || Kitt Peak || Spacewatch || EOS || align=right | 1.8 km || 
|-id=836 bgcolor=#fefefe
| 396836 ||  || — || August 11, 2004 || Socorro || LINEAR || — || align=right data-sort-value="0.94" | 940 m || 
|-id=837 bgcolor=#d6d6d6
| 396837 ||  || — || September 8, 2004 || Socorro || LINEAR || LIX || align=right | 3.6 km || 
|-id=838 bgcolor=#fefefe
| 396838 ||  || — || September 10, 2004 || Socorro || LINEAR || — || align=right data-sort-value="0.77" | 770 m || 
|-id=839 bgcolor=#fefefe
| 396839 ||  || — || September 10, 2004 || Socorro || LINEAR || — || align=right data-sort-value="0.87" | 870 m || 
|-id=840 bgcolor=#d6d6d6
| 396840 ||  || — || September 10, 2004 || Socorro || LINEAR || HYG || align=right | 3.3 km || 
|-id=841 bgcolor=#d6d6d6
| 396841 ||  || — || September 10, 2004 || Kitt Peak || Spacewatch || — || align=right | 5.0 km || 
|-id=842 bgcolor=#d6d6d6
| 396842 ||  || — || September 8, 2004 || Socorro || LINEAR || — || align=right | 2.8 km || 
|-id=843 bgcolor=#d6d6d6
| 396843 ||  || — || September 11, 2004 || Socorro || LINEAR || — || align=right | 4.5 km || 
|-id=844 bgcolor=#d6d6d6
| 396844 ||  || — || September 9, 2004 || Kitt Peak || Spacewatch || — || align=right | 2.7 km || 
|-id=845 bgcolor=#fefefe
| 396845 ||  || — || September 10, 2004 || Socorro || LINEAR || — || align=right data-sort-value="0.90" | 900 m || 
|-id=846 bgcolor=#fefefe
| 396846 ||  || — || September 10, 2004 || Kitt Peak || Spacewatch || — || align=right data-sort-value="0.78" | 780 m || 
|-id=847 bgcolor=#fefefe
| 396847 ||  || — || September 14, 2004 || Socorro || LINEAR || H || align=right data-sort-value="0.91" | 910 m || 
|-id=848 bgcolor=#fefefe
| 396848 ||  || — || September 11, 2004 || Kitt Peak || Spacewatch || — || align=right data-sort-value="0.78" | 780 m || 
|-id=849 bgcolor=#d6d6d6
| 396849 ||  || — || September 15, 2004 || Kitt Peak || Spacewatch || — || align=right | 2.9 km || 
|-id=850 bgcolor=#d6d6d6
| 396850 ||  || — || September 12, 2004 || Kitt Peak || Spacewatch || VER || align=right | 2.5 km || 
|-id=851 bgcolor=#fefefe
| 396851 ||  || — || September 15, 2004 || Kitt Peak || Spacewatch || — || align=right data-sort-value="0.71" | 710 m || 
|-id=852 bgcolor=#fefefe
| 396852 ||  || — || September 6, 2004 || Socorro || LINEAR || H || align=right data-sort-value="0.86" | 860 m || 
|-id=853 bgcolor=#FA8072
| 396853 ||  || — || September 16, 2004 || Socorro || LINEAR || critical || align=right data-sort-value="0.86" | 860 m || 
|-id=854 bgcolor=#d6d6d6
| 396854 ||  || — || September 18, 2004 || Moletai || K. Černis, J. Zdanavičius || — || align=right | 2.9 km || 
|-id=855 bgcolor=#fefefe
| 396855 ||  || — || September 8, 2004 || Socorro || LINEAR || — || align=right data-sort-value="0.65" | 650 m || 
|-id=856 bgcolor=#d6d6d6
| 396856 ||  || — || September 17, 2004 || Socorro || LINEAR || — || align=right | 4.1 km || 
|-id=857 bgcolor=#d6d6d6
| 396857 ||  || — || September 16, 2004 || Anderson Mesa || LONEOS || TIR || align=right | 2.4 km || 
|-id=858 bgcolor=#fefefe
| 396858 ||  || — || October 5, 2004 || Three Buttes || Three Buttes Obs. || — || align=right data-sort-value="0.83" | 830 m || 
|-id=859 bgcolor=#d6d6d6
| 396859 ||  || — || October 4, 2004 || Kitt Peak || Spacewatch || — || align=right | 2.7 km || 
|-id=860 bgcolor=#fefefe
| 396860 ||  || — || October 8, 2004 || Socorro || LINEAR || H || align=right | 1.0 km || 
|-id=861 bgcolor=#fefefe
| 396861 ||  || — || October 7, 2004 || Palomar || NEAT || — || align=right | 1.2 km || 
|-id=862 bgcolor=#E9E9E9
| 396862 ||  || — || October 9, 2004 || Anderson Mesa || LONEOS || — || align=right | 2.5 km || 
|-id=863 bgcolor=#fefefe
| 396863 ||  || — || October 7, 2004 || Kitt Peak || Spacewatch || — || align=right data-sort-value="0.72" | 720 m || 
|-id=864 bgcolor=#d6d6d6
| 396864 ||  || — || October 4, 2004 || Kitt Peak || Spacewatch || — || align=right | 3.9 km || 
|-id=865 bgcolor=#fefefe
| 396865 ||  || — || October 4, 2004 || Kitt Peak || Spacewatch || — || align=right data-sort-value="0.89" | 890 m || 
|-id=866 bgcolor=#d6d6d6
| 396866 ||  || — || October 4, 2004 || Kitt Peak || Spacewatch || — || align=right | 2.9 km || 
|-id=867 bgcolor=#fefefe
| 396867 ||  || — || September 15, 2004 || Kitt Peak || Spacewatch || — || align=right data-sort-value="0.75" | 750 m || 
|-id=868 bgcolor=#fefefe
| 396868 ||  || — || October 4, 2004 || Kitt Peak || Spacewatch || NYS || align=right data-sort-value="0.56" | 560 m || 
|-id=869 bgcolor=#fefefe
| 396869 ||  || — || October 4, 2004 || Kitt Peak || Spacewatch || V || align=right data-sort-value="0.62" | 620 m || 
|-id=870 bgcolor=#fefefe
| 396870 ||  || — || October 5, 2004 || Anderson Mesa || LONEOS || — || align=right | 1.1 km || 
|-id=871 bgcolor=#d6d6d6
| 396871 ||  || — || October 5, 2004 || Anderson Mesa || LONEOS || — || align=right | 3.7 km || 
|-id=872 bgcolor=#fefefe
| 396872 ||  || — || October 5, 2004 || Anderson Mesa || LONEOS || — || align=right data-sort-value="0.80" | 800 m || 
|-id=873 bgcolor=#d6d6d6
| 396873 ||  || — || October 4, 2004 || Socorro || LINEAR || TIR || align=right | 3.9 km || 
|-id=874 bgcolor=#fefefe
| 396874 ||  || — || September 17, 2004 || Kitt Peak || Spacewatch || — || align=right data-sort-value="0.78" | 780 m || 
|-id=875 bgcolor=#fefefe
| 396875 ||  || — || September 17, 2004 || Anderson Mesa || LONEOS || — || align=right | 1.1 km || 
|-id=876 bgcolor=#fefefe
| 396876 ||  || — || October 5, 2004 || Anderson Mesa || LONEOS || — || align=right | 1.0 km || 
|-id=877 bgcolor=#fefefe
| 396877 ||  || — || October 6, 2004 || Socorro || LINEAR || — || align=right | 1.0 km || 
|-id=878 bgcolor=#fefefe
| 396878 ||  || — || October 4, 2004 || Kitt Peak || Spacewatch || — || align=right data-sort-value="0.89" | 890 m || 
|-id=879 bgcolor=#fefefe
| 396879 ||  || — || September 18, 2004 || Socorro || LINEAR || — || align=right data-sort-value="0.98" | 980 m || 
|-id=880 bgcolor=#d6d6d6
| 396880 ||  || — || October 6, 2004 || Kitt Peak || Spacewatch || THM || align=right | 2.3 km || 
|-id=881 bgcolor=#fefefe
| 396881 ||  || — || February 12, 2002 || Kitt Peak || Spacewatch || — || align=right data-sort-value="0.81" | 810 m || 
|-id=882 bgcolor=#fefefe
| 396882 ||  || — || October 7, 2004 || Kitt Peak || Spacewatch || — || align=right | 1.1 km || 
|-id=883 bgcolor=#d6d6d6
| 396883 ||  || — || August 27, 2004 || Anderson Mesa || LONEOS || — || align=right | 3.0 km || 
|-id=884 bgcolor=#fefefe
| 396884 ||  || — || October 9, 2004 || Kitt Peak || Spacewatch || V || align=right data-sort-value="0.89" | 890 m || 
|-id=885 bgcolor=#fefefe
| 396885 ||  || — || October 9, 2004 || Kitt Peak || Spacewatch || — || align=right data-sort-value="0.71" | 710 m || 
|-id=886 bgcolor=#d6d6d6
| 396886 ||  || — || October 10, 2004 || Socorro || LINEAR || — || align=right | 5.4 km || 
|-id=887 bgcolor=#fefefe
| 396887 ||  || — || October 10, 2004 || Socorro || LINEAR || — || align=right | 2.2 km || 
|-id=888 bgcolor=#d6d6d6
| 396888 ||  || — || November 4, 2004 || Kitt Peak || Spacewatch || — || align=right | 4.0 km || 
|-id=889 bgcolor=#d6d6d6
| 396889 ||  || — || October 23, 2004 || Kitt Peak || Spacewatch || — || align=right | 4.0 km || 
|-id=890 bgcolor=#d6d6d6
| 396890 ||  || — || November 10, 2004 || Kitt Peak || Spacewatch || EUP || align=right | 4.6 km || 
|-id=891 bgcolor=#fefefe
| 396891 ||  || — || November 3, 2004 || Kitt Peak || Spacewatch || H || align=right data-sort-value="0.68" | 680 m || 
|-id=892 bgcolor=#fefefe
| 396892 ||  || — || November 19, 2004 || Socorro || LINEAR || H || align=right data-sort-value="0.78" | 780 m || 
|-id=893 bgcolor=#fefefe
| 396893 ||  || — || December 10, 2004 || Kitt Peak || Spacewatch || H || align=right data-sort-value="0.61" | 610 m || 
|-id=894 bgcolor=#fefefe
| 396894 ||  || — || December 7, 2004 || Socorro || LINEAR || H || align=right data-sort-value="0.72" | 720 m || 
|-id=895 bgcolor=#E9E9E9
| 396895 ||  || — || December 10, 2004 || Socorro || LINEAR || — || align=right | 1.2 km || 
|-id=896 bgcolor=#E9E9E9
| 396896 ||  || — || December 10, 2004 || Kitt Peak || Spacewatch || — || align=right data-sort-value="0.98" | 980 m || 
|-id=897 bgcolor=#d6d6d6
| 396897 ||  || — || December 10, 2004 || Jarnac || Jarnac Obs. || EOS || align=right | 3.3 km || 
|-id=898 bgcolor=#fefefe
| 396898 ||  || — || December 11, 2004 || Socorro || LINEAR || — || align=right data-sort-value="0.98" | 980 m || 
|-id=899 bgcolor=#fefefe
| 396899 ||  || — || December 11, 2004 || Kitt Peak || Spacewatch || — || align=right data-sort-value="0.71" | 710 m || 
|-id=900 bgcolor=#fefefe
| 396900 ||  || — || December 14, 2004 || Kitt Peak || Spacewatch || — || align=right data-sort-value="0.68" | 680 m || 
|}

396901–397000 

|-bgcolor=#d6d6d6
| 396901 ||  || — || December 15, 2004 || Socorro || LINEAR || Tj (2.99) || align=right | 4.8 km || 
|-id=902 bgcolor=#fefefe
| 396902 ||  || — || November 9, 2004 || Catalina || CSS || — || align=right data-sort-value="0.95" | 950 m || 
|-id=903 bgcolor=#E9E9E9
| 396903 ||  || — || December 18, 2004 || Mount Lemmon || Mount Lemmon Survey || — || align=right data-sort-value="0.92" | 920 m || 
|-id=904 bgcolor=#fefefe
| 396904 ||  || — || December 18, 2004 || Mount Lemmon || Mount Lemmon Survey || — || align=right data-sort-value="0.92" | 920 m || 
|-id=905 bgcolor=#fefefe
| 396905 ||  || — || December 15, 2004 || Campo Imperatore || CINEOS || PHO || align=right data-sort-value="0.98" | 980 m || 
|-id=906 bgcolor=#E9E9E9
| 396906 ||  || — || January 13, 2005 || Socorro || LINEAR || (5) || align=right data-sort-value="0.90" | 900 m || 
|-id=907 bgcolor=#E9E9E9
| 396907 ||  || — || January 13, 2005 || Catalina || CSS || — || align=right | 1.3 km || 
|-id=908 bgcolor=#E9E9E9
| 396908 ||  || — || January 7, 2005 || Kitt Peak || Spacewatch || (5) || align=right data-sort-value="0.76" | 760 m || 
|-id=909 bgcolor=#E9E9E9
| 396909 ||  || — || January 16, 2005 || Kitt Peak || Spacewatch || — || align=right data-sort-value="0.88" | 880 m || 
|-id=910 bgcolor=#E9E9E9
| 396910 ||  || — || January 17, 2005 || Kitt Peak || Spacewatch || — || align=right | 1.8 km || 
|-id=911 bgcolor=#E9E9E9
| 396911 ||  || — || December 20, 2004 || Mount Lemmon || Mount Lemmon Survey || — || align=right | 1.1 km || 
|-id=912 bgcolor=#E9E9E9
| 396912 ||  || — || February 2, 2005 || Kitt Peak || Spacewatch || — || align=right | 1.4 km || 
|-id=913 bgcolor=#E9E9E9
| 396913 ||  || — || March 4, 2005 || Catalina || CSS || — || align=right | 2.1 km || 
|-id=914 bgcolor=#E9E9E9
| 396914 ||  || — || March 3, 2005 || Kitt Peak || Spacewatch || — || align=right | 1.6 km || 
|-id=915 bgcolor=#E9E9E9
| 396915 ||  || — || March 4, 2005 || Catalina || CSS || — || align=right | 1.6 km || 
|-id=916 bgcolor=#E9E9E9
| 396916 ||  || — || March 4, 2005 || Mount Lemmon || Mount Lemmon Survey || (5) || align=right data-sort-value="0.86" | 860 m || 
|-id=917 bgcolor=#E9E9E9
| 396917 ||  || — || March 4, 2005 || Kitt Peak || Spacewatch || — || align=right | 1.6 km || 
|-id=918 bgcolor=#E9E9E9
| 396918 ||  || — || March 9, 2005 || Socorro || LINEAR || — || align=right | 1.4 km || 
|-id=919 bgcolor=#E9E9E9
| 396919 ||  || — || March 4, 2005 || Catalina || CSS || — || align=right | 2.2 km || 
|-id=920 bgcolor=#E9E9E9
| 396920 ||  || — || March 7, 2005 || Socorro || LINEAR || JUN || align=right | 1.3 km || 
|-id=921 bgcolor=#E9E9E9
| 396921 ||  || — || March 10, 2005 || Catalina || CSS || — || align=right | 2.2 km || 
|-id=922 bgcolor=#E9E9E9
| 396922 ||  || — || March 9, 2005 || Mount Lemmon || Mount Lemmon Survey || EUN || align=right | 1.1 km || 
|-id=923 bgcolor=#E9E9E9
| 396923 ||  || — || March 11, 2005 || Anderson Mesa || LONEOS || — || align=right | 1.8 km || 
|-id=924 bgcolor=#E9E9E9
| 396924 ||  || — || March 11, 2005 || Kitt Peak || Spacewatch || — || align=right | 1.6 km || 
|-id=925 bgcolor=#E9E9E9
| 396925 ||  || — || March 11, 2005 || Mount Lemmon || Mount Lemmon Survey || — || align=right | 1.2 km || 
|-id=926 bgcolor=#E9E9E9
| 396926 ||  || — || March 15, 2005 || Catalina || CSS || — || align=right | 1.7 km || 
|-id=927 bgcolor=#E9E9E9
| 396927 ||  || — || March 11, 2005 || Catalina || CSS || — || align=right | 1.7 km || 
|-id=928 bgcolor=#E9E9E9
| 396928 ||  || — || March 10, 2005 || Mount Lemmon || Mount Lemmon Survey || EUN || align=right | 1.1 km || 
|-id=929 bgcolor=#E9E9E9
| 396929 ||  || — || March 30, 2005 || Catalina || CSS || JUN || align=right | 1.1 km || 
|-id=930 bgcolor=#E9E9E9
| 396930 ||  || — || April 4, 2005 || Catalina || CSS || EUN || align=right | 1.5 km || 
|-id=931 bgcolor=#E9E9E9
| 396931 Nerliluca ||  ||  || April 4, 2005 || San Marcello || L. Tesi, G. Fagioli || MIS || align=right | 2.7 km || 
|-id=932 bgcolor=#E9E9E9
| 396932 ||  || — || April 2, 2005 || Mount Lemmon || Mount Lemmon Survey || — || align=right | 1.8 km || 
|-id=933 bgcolor=#E9E9E9
| 396933 ||  || — || April 6, 2005 || Kitt Peak || Spacewatch || — || align=right | 1.6 km || 
|-id=934 bgcolor=#E9E9E9
| 396934 ||  || — || April 9, 2005 || Mount Lemmon || Mount Lemmon Survey || — || align=right | 1.6 km || 
|-id=935 bgcolor=#E9E9E9
| 396935 ||  || — || April 13, 2005 || Mayhill || A. Lowe || JUN || align=right | 1.2 km || 
|-id=936 bgcolor=#E9E9E9
| 396936 ||  || — || April 12, 2005 || Socorro || LINEAR || — || align=right | 1.3 km || 
|-id=937 bgcolor=#E9E9E9
| 396937 ||  || — || April 11, 2005 || Mount Lemmon || Mount Lemmon Survey || PAD || align=right | 1.6 km || 
|-id=938 bgcolor=#E9E9E9
| 396938 ||  || — || April 14, 2005 || Kitt Peak || Spacewatch || — || align=right | 1.5 km || 
|-id=939 bgcolor=#E9E9E9
| 396939 ||  || — || May 3, 2005 || Kitt Peak || Spacewatch || — || align=right | 1.3 km || 
|-id=940 bgcolor=#E9E9E9
| 396940 ||  || — || May 3, 2005 || Kitt Peak || Spacewatch || — || align=right | 2.5 km || 
|-id=941 bgcolor=#E9E9E9
| 396941 ||  || — || May 3, 2005 || Kitt Peak || Spacewatch || MRX || align=right data-sort-value="0.91" | 910 m || 
|-id=942 bgcolor=#E9E9E9
| 396942 ||  || — || May 4, 2005 || Palomar || NEAT || — || align=right | 2.0 km || 
|-id=943 bgcolor=#E9E9E9
| 396943 ||  || — || May 8, 2005 || Kitt Peak || Spacewatch || — || align=right | 1.5 km || 
|-id=944 bgcolor=#E9E9E9
| 396944 ||  || — || May 8, 2005 || Mount Lemmon || Mount Lemmon Survey || — || align=right | 1.9 km || 
|-id=945 bgcolor=#E9E9E9
| 396945 ||  || — || May 11, 2005 || Mount Lemmon || Mount Lemmon Survey || DOR || align=right | 2.2 km || 
|-id=946 bgcolor=#E9E9E9
| 396946 ||  || — || May 10, 2005 || Kitt Peak || Spacewatch || — || align=right | 2.2 km || 
|-id=947 bgcolor=#E9E9E9
| 396947 ||  || — || May 15, 2005 || Mount Lemmon || Mount Lemmon Survey || — || align=right | 2.6 km || 
|-id=948 bgcolor=#FA8072
| 396948 ||  || — || May 9, 2005 || Kitt Peak || Spacewatch || — || align=right | 1.2 km || 
|-id=949 bgcolor=#E9E9E9
| 396949 ||  || — || May 11, 2005 || Mount Lemmon || Mount Lemmon Survey || — || align=right | 1.3 km || 
|-id=950 bgcolor=#E9E9E9
| 396950 ||  || — || May 13, 2005 || Kitt Peak || Spacewatch || — || align=right | 2.4 km || 
|-id=951 bgcolor=#E9E9E9
| 396951 ||  || — || June 8, 2005 || Kitt Peak || Spacewatch || — || align=right | 2.4 km || 
|-id=952 bgcolor=#E9E9E9
| 396952 ||  || — || June 8, 2005 || Kitt Peak || Spacewatch || — || align=right | 2.5 km || 
|-id=953 bgcolor=#E9E9E9
| 396953 ||  || — || April 30, 2005 || Kitt Peak || Spacewatch || — || align=right | 2.4 km || 
|-id=954 bgcolor=#fefefe
| 396954 ||  || — || June 10, 2005 || Kitt Peak || Spacewatch || — || align=right data-sort-value="0.72" | 720 m || 
|-id=955 bgcolor=#E9E9E9
| 396955 ||  || — || June 11, 2005 || Kitt Peak || Spacewatch || — || align=right | 2.3 km || 
|-id=956 bgcolor=#d6d6d6
| 396956 ||  || — || July 1, 2005 || Kitt Peak || Spacewatch || — || align=right | 2.9 km || 
|-id=957 bgcolor=#fefefe
| 396957 ||  || — || August 22, 2005 || Palomar || NEAT || — || align=right data-sort-value="0.75" | 750 m || 
|-id=958 bgcolor=#d6d6d6
| 396958 ||  || — || August 27, 2005 || Kitt Peak || Spacewatch || — || align=right | 2.1 km || 
|-id=959 bgcolor=#fefefe
| 396959 ||  || — || August 27, 2005 || Kitt Peak || Spacewatch || — || align=right data-sort-value="0.65" | 650 m || 
|-id=960 bgcolor=#E9E9E9
| 396960 ||  || — || August 29, 2005 || Anderson Mesa || LONEOS || — || align=right | 2.7 km || 
|-id=961 bgcolor=#d6d6d6
| 396961 ||  || — || August 27, 2005 || Palomar || NEAT || — || align=right | 2.9 km || 
|-id=962 bgcolor=#d6d6d6
| 396962 ||  || — || August 28, 2005 || Kitt Peak || Spacewatch || — || align=right | 2.5 km || 
|-id=963 bgcolor=#fefefe
| 396963 ||  || — || August 31, 2005 || Kitt Peak || Spacewatch || — || align=right data-sort-value="0.83" | 830 m || 
|-id=964 bgcolor=#fefefe
| 396964 ||  || — || August 28, 2005 || Anderson Mesa || LONEOS || — || align=right data-sort-value="0.93" | 930 m || 
|-id=965 bgcolor=#d6d6d6
| 396965 ||  || — || August 30, 2005 || Kitt Peak || Spacewatch || — || align=right | 1.9 km || 
|-id=966 bgcolor=#d6d6d6
| 396966 ||  || — || September 14, 2005 || Apache Point || A. C. Becker || — || align=right | 3.0 km || 
|-id=967 bgcolor=#FA8072
| 396967 ||  || — || July 10, 2005 || Catalina || CSS || — || align=right data-sort-value="0.48" | 480 m || 
|-id=968 bgcolor=#fefefe
| 396968 ||  || — || September 23, 2005 || Kitt Peak || Spacewatch || — || align=right data-sort-value="0.81" | 810 m || 
|-id=969 bgcolor=#d6d6d6
| 396969 ||  || — || September 23, 2005 || Kitt Peak || Spacewatch || — || align=right | 3.0 km || 
|-id=970 bgcolor=#fefefe
| 396970 ||  || — || September 25, 2005 || Kitt Peak || Spacewatch || — || align=right data-sort-value="0.85" | 850 m || 
|-id=971 bgcolor=#d6d6d6
| 396971 ||  || — || September 25, 2005 || Kitt Peak || Spacewatch || — || align=right | 3.1 km || 
|-id=972 bgcolor=#d6d6d6
| 396972 ||  || — || September 25, 2005 || Kitt Peak || Spacewatch || — || align=right | 5.5 km || 
|-id=973 bgcolor=#d6d6d6
| 396973 ||  || — || September 26, 2005 || Kitt Peak || Spacewatch || — || align=right | 2.4 km || 
|-id=974 bgcolor=#d6d6d6
| 396974 ||  || — || September 24, 2005 || Kitt Peak || Spacewatch || — || align=right | 2.2 km || 
|-id=975 bgcolor=#fefefe
| 396975 ||  || — || September 24, 2005 || Kitt Peak || Spacewatch || — || align=right data-sort-value="0.71" | 710 m || 
|-id=976 bgcolor=#d6d6d6
| 396976 ||  || — || September 25, 2005 || Kitt Peak || Spacewatch || — || align=right | 3.0 km || 
|-id=977 bgcolor=#d6d6d6
| 396977 ||  || — || September 25, 2005 || Kitt Peak || Spacewatch || — || align=right | 3.3 km || 
|-id=978 bgcolor=#d6d6d6
| 396978 ||  || — || September 25, 2005 || Palomar || NEAT || EOS || align=right | 2.8 km || 
|-id=979 bgcolor=#d6d6d6
| 396979 ||  || — || September 26, 2005 || Kitt Peak || Spacewatch || — || align=right | 2.8 km || 
|-id=980 bgcolor=#d6d6d6
| 396980 ||  || — || September 26, 2005 || Palomar || NEAT || — || align=right | 3.2 km || 
|-id=981 bgcolor=#E9E9E9
| 396981 ||  || — || September 28, 2005 || Palomar || NEAT || — || align=right | 2.7 km || 
|-id=982 bgcolor=#d6d6d6
| 396982 ||  || — || September 29, 2005 || Mount Lemmon || Mount Lemmon Survey || — || align=right | 2.8 km || 
|-id=983 bgcolor=#d6d6d6
| 396983 ||  || — || September 29, 2005 || Anderson Mesa || LONEOS || THM || align=right | 2.3 km || 
|-id=984 bgcolor=#fefefe
| 396984 ||  || — || September 29, 2005 || Mount Lemmon || Mount Lemmon Survey || — || align=right data-sort-value="0.42" | 420 m || 
|-id=985 bgcolor=#d6d6d6
| 396985 ||  || — || September 24, 2005 || Kitt Peak || Spacewatch || — || align=right | 2.2 km || 
|-id=986 bgcolor=#d6d6d6
| 396986 ||  || — || September 25, 2005 || Kitt Peak || Spacewatch || — || align=right | 2.6 km || 
|-id=987 bgcolor=#d6d6d6
| 396987 ||  || — || September 25, 2005 || Kitt Peak || Spacewatch || EOS || align=right | 2.0 km || 
|-id=988 bgcolor=#d6d6d6
| 396988 ||  || — || September 26, 2005 || Kitt Peak || Spacewatch || — || align=right | 2.7 km || 
|-id=989 bgcolor=#d6d6d6
| 396989 ||  || — || September 29, 2005 || Kitt Peak || Spacewatch || EOS || align=right | 1.6 km || 
|-id=990 bgcolor=#E9E9E9
| 396990 ||  || — || September 29, 2005 || Kitt Peak || Spacewatch || — || align=right | 2.2 km || 
|-id=991 bgcolor=#d6d6d6
| 396991 ||  || — || September 29, 2005 || Kitt Peak || Spacewatch || — || align=right | 2.0 km || 
|-id=992 bgcolor=#d6d6d6
| 396992 ||  || — || September 29, 2005 || Kitt Peak || Spacewatch || EOS || align=right | 2.1 km || 
|-id=993 bgcolor=#d6d6d6
| 396993 ||  || — || September 29, 2005 || Kitt Peak || Spacewatch || — || align=right | 2.4 km || 
|-id=994 bgcolor=#d6d6d6
| 396994 ||  || — || September 24, 2005 || Kitt Peak || Spacewatch || EOS || align=right | 2.1 km || 
|-id=995 bgcolor=#d6d6d6
| 396995 ||  || — || September 30, 2005 || Kitt Peak || Spacewatch || EOS || align=right | 1.7 km || 
|-id=996 bgcolor=#d6d6d6
| 396996 ||  || — || September 30, 2005 || Anderson Mesa || LONEOS || — || align=right | 2.7 km || 
|-id=997 bgcolor=#fefefe
| 396997 ||  || — || September 30, 2005 || Kitt Peak || Spacewatch || — || align=right data-sort-value="0.57" | 570 m || 
|-id=998 bgcolor=#d6d6d6
| 396998 ||  || — || September 29, 2005 || Kitt Peak || Spacewatch || — || align=right | 2.5 km || 
|-id=999 bgcolor=#d6d6d6
| 396999 ||  || — || September 25, 2005 || Kitt Peak || Spacewatch || — || align=right | 3.3 km || 
|-id=000 bgcolor=#d6d6d6
| 397000 ||  || — || September 21, 2005 || Apache Point || A. C. Becker || — || align=right | 2.5 km || 
|}

References

External links 
 Discovery Circumstances: Numbered Minor Planets (395001)–(400000) (IAU Minor Planet Center)

0396